= Chetnole =

Village and civil parish in Dorset, England

Coordinates: 50.8701°N 2.5669°W

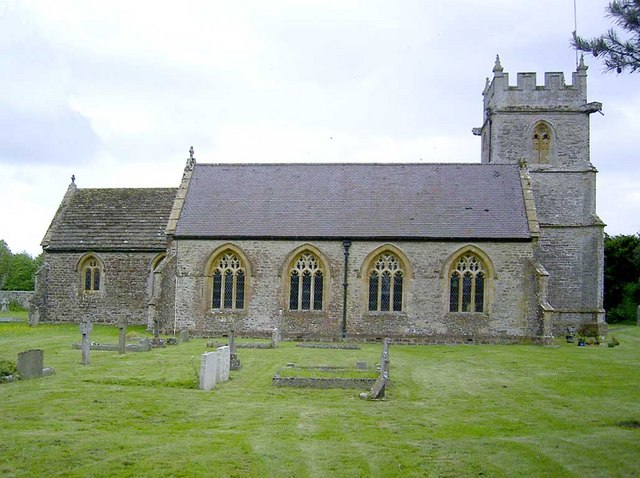
- Parish church of St Peter

- Location within Dorset
- Population: 330
- OS grid reference: ST602080
- Unitary authority: Dorset
- Ceremonial county: Dorset
- Region: South West
- Country: England
- Sovereign state: United Kingdom
- Post town: Sherborne
- Postcode district: DT9
- Police: Dorset
- Fire: Dorset and Wiltshire
- Ambulance: South Western
- UK Parliament: West Dorset

Chetnole is a village and civil parish in the county of Dorset in southern England. It lies approximately 6 miles (9.7 km) south-southwest of Sherborne and 5.5 miles (8.9 km) southeast of Yeovil in Somerset. It is sited on Oxford clay by the small Wriggle River at the western end of the Blackmore Vale. There are around 128 houses in the village. It has a railway station on the Heart of Wessex Line that is served by Great Western Railway services. Dorset County Council estimate that in 2013 the population of the parish was 330. In the 2011 census the population of Chetnole parish combined with the small parish of Stockwood to the west was 344.

Chetnole was not recorded in the Domesday Book in 1086.

== History ==
The name "Chetnole" is thought to mean ‘Ceatta’s hillock or hilltop’ from an Old English proper name and 'cnoll'. Chetnole is not mentioned in the Domesday Book of 1086 and there is no convincing evidence of a settlement at that time. The Parish Church of St Peter is made up of several different buildings from different time periods: the 13th Century barrel-vaulted nave, the 15th Century tower, the 17th Century porch and the 19th Century chancel. The country house, Nappers, was used as a military hospital during the First World War.

Chetnole is situated on the small River Wriggle which flows north from Hilfield to the River Yeo near Bradford Abbas. There was a school in Chetnole, at the end of School Lane, from 1851 until 1938.

== Governance ==
Chetnole is included in an electoral ward with Yetminster and other surrounding areas. The ward is one of 32 that comprise the West Dorset parliamentary constituency.

== Geography ==
Chetnole is located approximately 6 miles southwest of Sherborne, 5.5 miles southeast of Yeovil, 2 miles south of Yetminster, and 2 miles north of Evershot.

== Amenities ==
Chetnole is located near the Roman road to Dorchester, and is served by the 212 bus service between Dorchester and Yeovil. (Withdrawn) There is the award-winning, four-star rated Chetnole Inn. The nearest GP surgery is Yetminster with the nearest hospitals being the Sherborne Yeatman Hospital or the Yeovil District Hospital.

== Chetnole Railway Station ==
Chetnole railway station is a small rural station serving the village. It was originally opened as a timber structure on 11 September 1933, although this was replaced by the current concrete one in the 1960s.

Great Western Railway operate services between Gloucester and Weymouth via Bristol Temple Meads and Westbury. South Western Railway runs an additional service running once on a Saturday between Weymouth and Yeovil Junction.

In 2015/2016, the annual rail passenger usage was 1,946.

== John Hewlett ==
John Hewlett was born in Chetnole in 1762.
