= St Peter's Church, Chetnole =

Church of St Peter
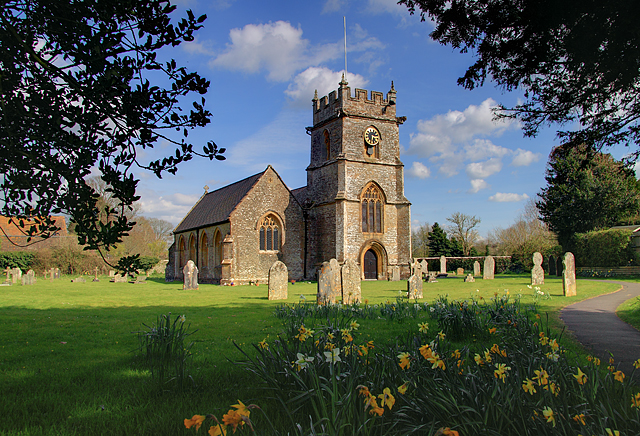
- Church of St Peter
- 50°52′18.480″N 2°33′59.940″W
- OS grid reference: ST 60224 08190
- Location: Chetnole, Dorset
- Country: England
- Denomination: Church of England
- Website: www.threevalleysteam.org.uk

Architecture
- Heritage designation: Grade II*
- Designated: 31 July 1961

Administration
- Diocese: Diocese of Salisbury

St Peter's Church is an Anglican church in the village of Chetnole, Dorset, and in the Diocese of Salisbury. It is in the Three Valleys Benefice. The church, with 13th-century origins and 15th-century additions, was partly rebuilt in the 19th century. It is a Grade II* listed building.

== History and description ==
The church was originally a chapel of ease of Yetminster.

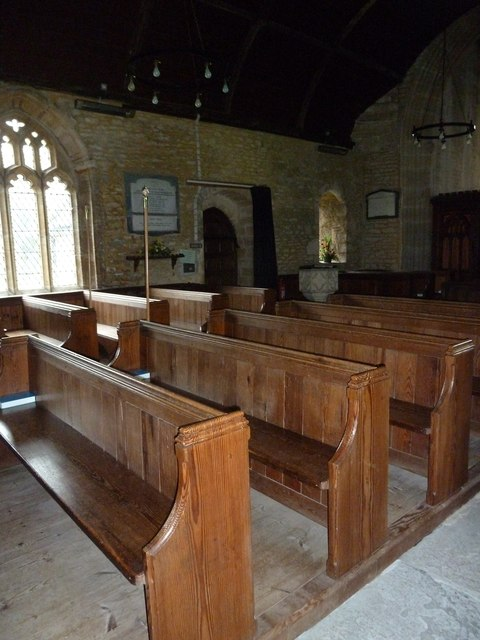
Interior, looking towards the south wall

There is a west tower, a nave, north aisle, and chancel and south porch, with diagonal buttresses to the chancel and aisle. The south wall of the nave survives from the 13th-century church; the window west of the porch is a narrow lancet from that time, and the two three-light windows east of the porch are 15th-century. The nave roof, of the 15th century, is barrel-vaulted; it has seven bays, each of four panels, with moulded ribs and foliage bosses.

The tower, built in the 15th century, has two stages, an embattled parapet and pinnacles, with large gargoyles at the corners. The angle buttresses on the east side rest on large head-corbels which are visible inside the nave.

The south porch was built in the 17th century.

=== Nineteenth century ===
There was renovation in 1860–65 by William Slater; the chancel was rebuilt, and the north aisle and four-bay arcade was added. The north wall has four three-light windows, and the east window of the aisle has a reset 15th-century three-light window. The octagonal font and oak pulpit are 19th-century.

=== Bells ===
There are three bells, of which two are thought to be by William Chamberlain, made in the late 14th century; they are inscribed "Wox Augustinae sonet in aure Dei" ("The voice of Augustine speaks in the ear of God") and "Sancte Laurenti ora pro nobis" ("Saint Lawrence pray for us").
