= Yetminster railway station =

Railway station in Dorset, England

Yetminster
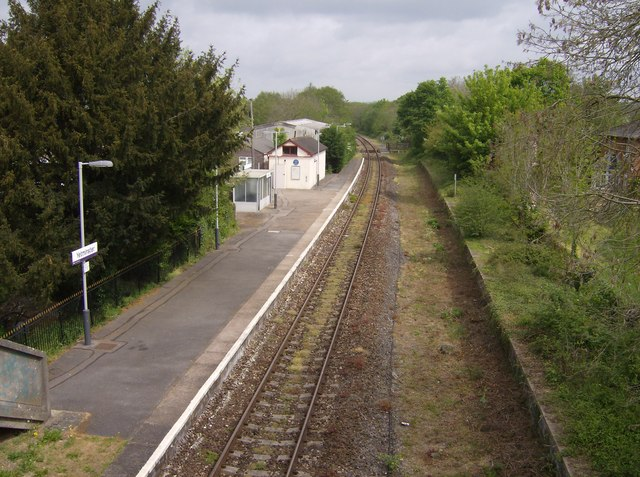

General information
- Location: Yetminster, Dorset; England
- Coordinates: 50.8958°N 2.5738°W
- Grid reference: ST597108
- Manager: Great Western Railway
- Platforms: 1

Other information
- Station code: YET
- Classification: DfT category F2

History
- Original company: Great Western Railway

Key dates
- 1857: opened

Passengers
- 2021/22: ▲5,302
- 2022/23: ▲6,828
- 2023/24: ▲7,550
- 2024/25: ▼7,088
- 2025/26: ▲7,824
Location
Notes
- Passenger statistics from the Office of Rail and Road

Yetminster railway station serves the village of Yetminster in Dorset, England. The station is on the Heart of Wessex Line, 23.25 miles (37 km) north of Weymouth. The station is 145.46 miles (234.10 kilometres) from the zero point at London Paddington, measured via Swindon and Westbury.

Yetminster railway station is managed by Great Western Railway.

== History ==
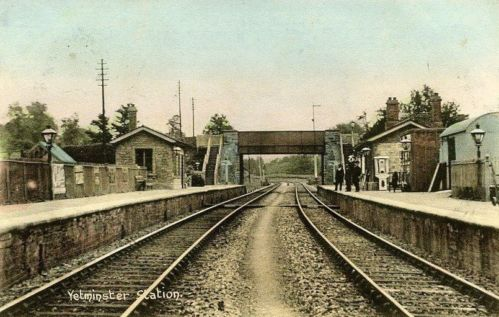
Looking south from Yetminster in c. 1910, with the second platform still in use.

The station was opened by the Great Western Railway on 20 January 1857 as part of their Wilts, Somerset and Weymouth line.

== Facilities ==
Yetminster has basic facilities including a small waiting shelter, a car park, a help point and bike racks. It has 2 entrances: one from the main road, and one from the car park, the latter of the two being step-free.

== Services ==
Great Western Railway operate services between Gloucester and Weymouth. South Western Railway used to run an additional service once on a Saturday between Weymouth and Yeovil Junction operating from late May to early September each year. This is a request stop so passengers must signal clearly to the driver if they wish to board the train.

Preceding station	National Rail	Following station
Thornford	Great Western Railway; Heart of Wessex Line	Chetnole
