= Mayflower (passenger train) =

The Mayflower
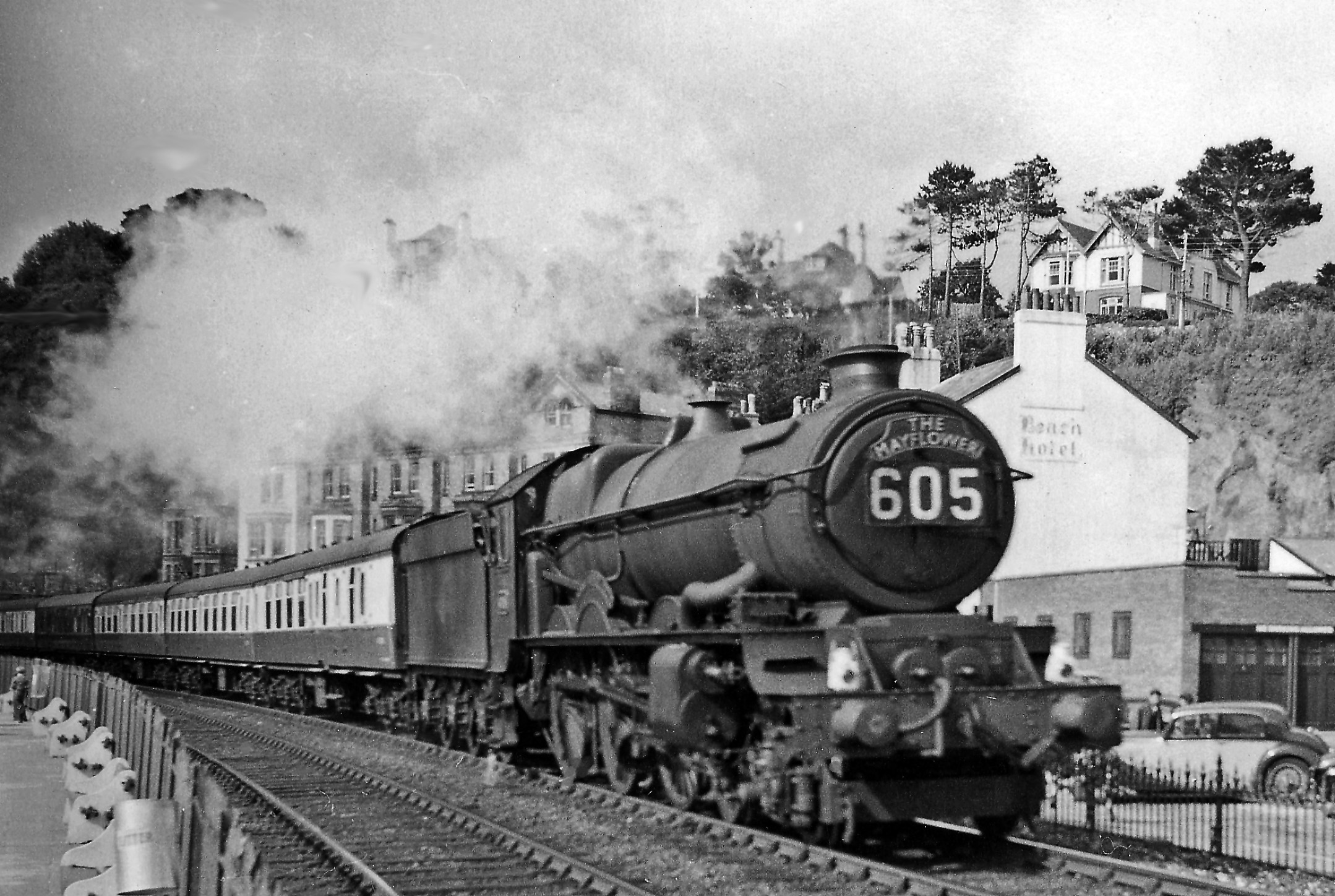
- 6018 King Henry VI with The Mayflower at Dawlish in 1958

Overview
- Service type: Passenger train
- First service: 17 June 1957
- Current operator(s): Great Western Railway
- Former operator(s): Western Region of British Railways

Route
- Termini: London Paddington; Plymouth
- Distance travelled: 246 miles
- Average journey time: 3 hours 10 minutes
- Service frequency: Daily
- Train number(s): 1C78 / 1A90
- Line(s) used: Great Western; Reading-Taunton; Bristol-Exeter; Exeter-Plymouth

Technical
- Rolling stock: 800, 802

The Mayflower is a named passenger train service operated by Great Western Railway in England from London Paddington to Plymouth.

== History ==
The Mayflower was introduced by the Western Region of British Railways on 5 June 1957, departing Plymouth at 08:30 for London Paddington, returning at 17:30.

The Mayflower working was normally booked to a Plymouth Laira King class locomotive although the less powerful Castle class would have regularly deputised. Within a few years The Mayflower was turned over to diesel operation by Class 42 and Class 52 classes.

It was withdrawn on 12 June 1965, before the name was reintroduced from 5 May 1970 to 30 April 1971 on the 07:30 service from Paddington and 16:30 return to celebrate the 350th anniversary of the sailing of its namesake.

It operated again from 1983 until 1985 with High Speed Trains. First Great Western reintroduced it in 1998. As at July 2019, the name was carried by the 11:06 from Paddington and 15:00 return operated by Class 800 and Class 802s.
