= Thornford railway station =

Railway station in Dorset, England

Thornford
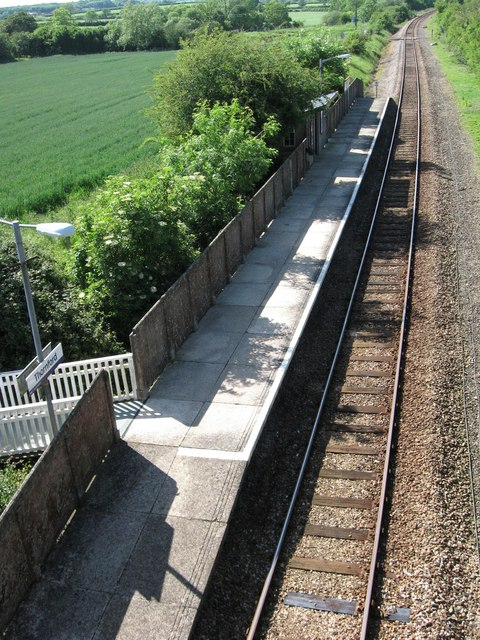

General information
- Location: Thornford, Dorset; England
- Coordinates: 50.9107°N 2.5792°W
- Grid reference: ST593125
- Manager: Great Western Railway
- Platforms: 1

Other information
- Station code: THO
- Classification: DfT category F2

History
- Original company: Great Western Railway

Key dates
- 23 March 1936: Opened

Passengers
- 2021/22: ▲2,366
- Interchange: ▲6
- 2022/23: ▲2,916
- 2023/24: ▲3,340
- 2024/25: ▼2,312
- 2025/26: ▲3,594
Location
Notes
- Passenger statistics from the Office of Rail and Road

Thornford railway station serves the village of Thornford, in Dorset, England. It is approximately 3 miles (4.8 kilometres) to the south of Yeovil, and 144.35 miles (232.31 kilometres) from the zero point at London Paddington (measured via Swindon and Westbury). It is managed by Great Western Railway and is served by trains on the Heart of Wessex Line between Bristol Temple Meads and Weymouth.

== History ==
The station was opened by the Great Western Railway on 23 March 1936 as Thornford Bridge Halt. It was renamed Thornford Bridge in 1969 and became Thornford in 1974.

== Facilities ==
Thornford only has the most basic facilities, being a small waiting area, a help point, bike racks and some information boards including timetable posters.

== Services ==
Great Western Railway operate services between Gloucester and Weymouth via Bristol Temple Meads. South Western Railway runs additional services on Summer Saturdays between Weymouth and Yeovil Junction operating from late May to early September. This is a request stop so passengers must signal clearly to the driver if they wish to board the train.

Preceding station	National Rail	Following station
Yeovil Pen Mill	Great Western Railway; Heart of Wessex Line	Yetminster
