= Chetnole railway station =

Railway station in Dorset, England

Chetnole
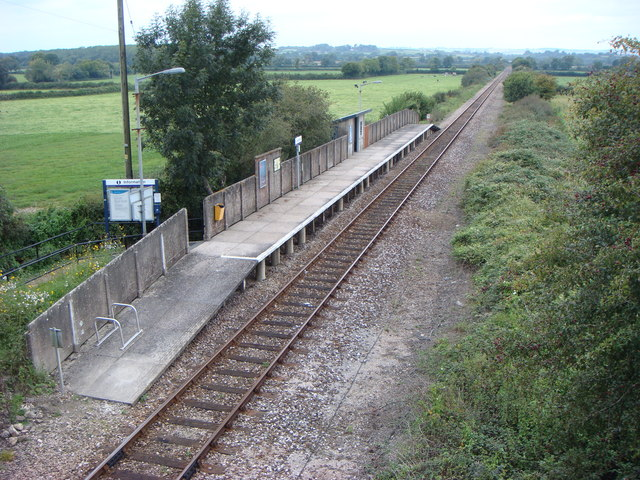
- Chetnole station, 2007

General information
- Location: Chetnole, Dorset; England
- Coordinates: 50.8664°N 2.5730°W
- Grid reference: ST597075
- Manager: Great Western Railway
- Platforms: 1

Other information
- Station code: CNO
- Classification: DfT category F2

History
- Original company: Great Western Railway

Key dates
- 11 September 1933: Opened

Passengers
- 2021/22: ▲1,768
- 2022/23: ▲2,048
- 2023/24: ▲2,238
- 2024/25: ▲2,638
- 2025/26: ▲2,926
Location
Notes
- Passenger statistics from the Office of Rail and Road

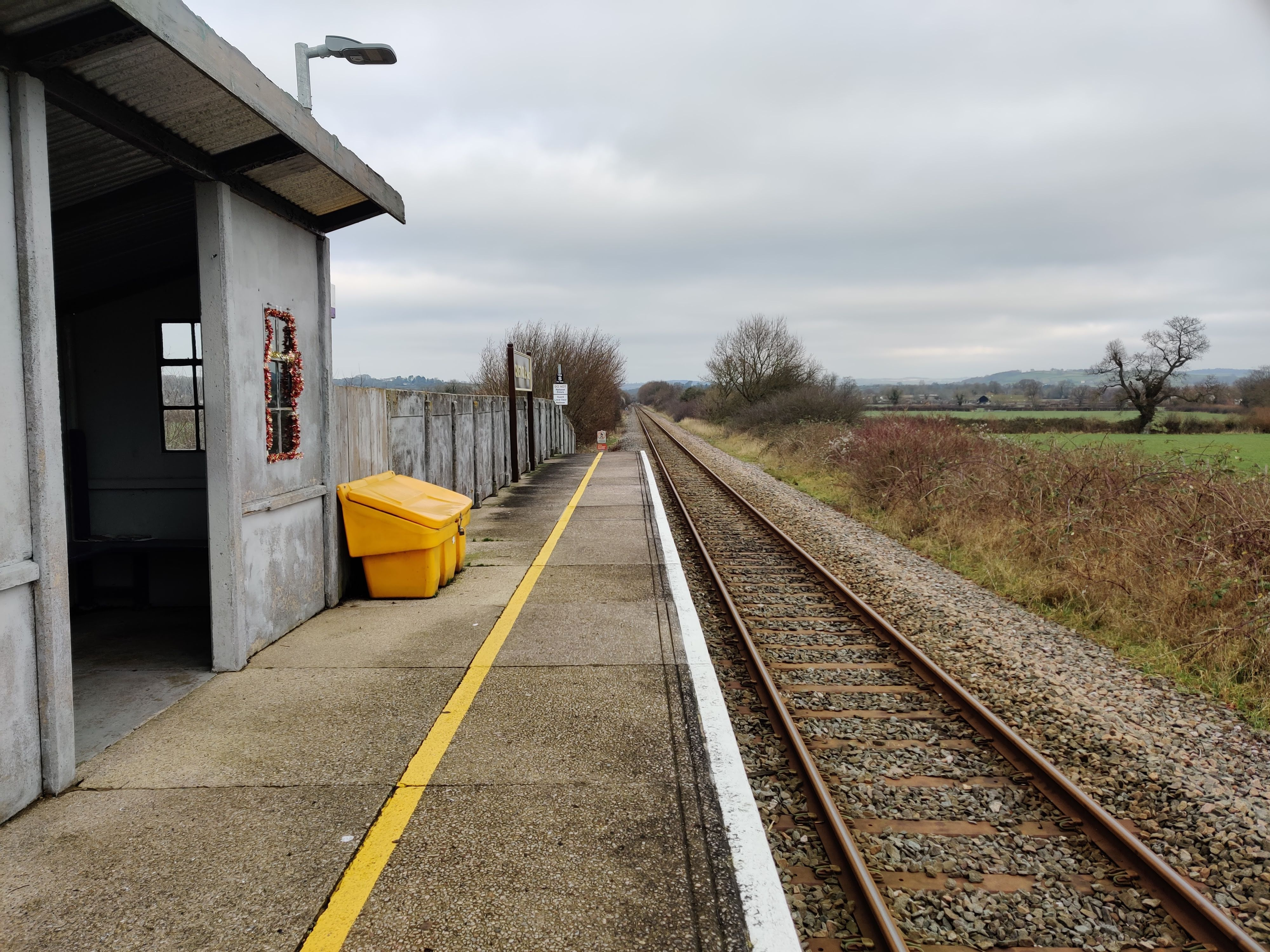
View from the platform of Chetnole Station, looking northbound towards Yeovil, 2019

Chetnole railway station is a small rural station serving the village of Chetnole, Dorset, England. The station is on the Heart of Wessex Line 21¼ miles (34 km) north of Weymouth towards Westbury, and 147.5 miles (237.4 kilometres) from the zero point at London Paddington, measured via Swindon and Westbury.

== History ==
The station was opened on 11 September 1933, being originally built of timber. This was replaced by a concrete structure, believed to be in the 1960s. The line was converted to a single track in 1968.

== Facilities ==
Chetnole only has the most basic facilities, being a small waiting area (payphone removed), a help point, bike racks and some information boards including timetable posters. There is no step-free access.

== Services ==
Great Western Railway operate services between Gloucester and Weymouth via Bristol Temple Meads and Westbury (8 per day each way on weekdays and Saturdays, 3-5 each way on Sundays depending on the time of year). South Western Railway used to run additional services between Weymouth and Yeovil Junction on Summer Saturdays. The station is a request stop, meaning passengers wishing to board a train need to signal clearly to the driver as the train approaches.

| Preceding station | National Rail | Following station |
|---|---|---|
| Yetminster | Great Western Railway; Heart of Wessex Line | Maiden Newton |

== Bibliography ==
- Butt, R. V. J. (October 1995). The Directory of Railway Stations: details every public and private passenger station, halt, platform and stopping place, past and present (1st ed.). Sparkford: Patrick Stephens Ltd. ISBN 978-1-85260-508-7. OCLC 60251199. OL 11956311M.
- Jowett, Alan (2000). Jowett's Nationalised Railway Atlas (1st ed.). Penryn, Cornwall: Atlantic Transport Publishers. ISBN 978-0-906899-99-1. OCLC 228266687.
- Jowett, Alan (March 1989). Jowett's Railway Atlas of Great Britain and Ireland: From Pre-Grouping to the Present Day (1st ed.). Sparkford: Patrick Stephens Ltd. ISBN 978-1-85260-086-0. OCLC 22311137.
