= Thornford =

Village in Dorset, England

Coordinates: 50.9167°N 2.5635°W

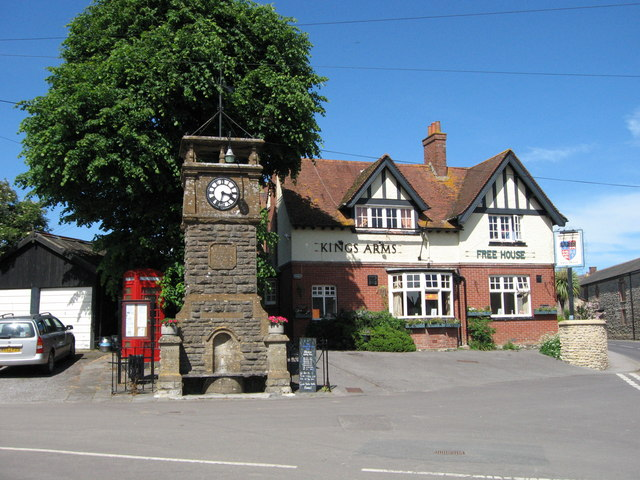

- Location within Dorset
- Population: 830
- OS grid reference: ST604132
- Unitary authority: Dorset
- Ceremonial county: Dorset
- Region: South West
- Country: England
- Sovereign state: United Kingdom
- Post town: SHERBORNE
- Postcode district: DT9
- Dialling code: 01935
- Police: Dorset
- Fire: Dorset and Wiltshire
- Ambulance: South Western
- UK Parliament: West Dorset

Thornford is a village and civil parish in north-west Dorset, England, situated in the Yeo valley 4 miles (6.4 km) southwest of Sherborne. Dorset County Council's 2013 mid-year estimate of the population of the parish is 830.

Thornford is in Thornhackett Parish, a combined parish comprising the villages of Thornford and Beer Hackett. The Parish Council comprises seven elected members from Thornford and three from Beer Hackett, all of whom serve a four-year term of office.

The village has a general store and post office, a pub, a primary school, a Norman church, a village hall, a recreation field, a cricket club and a railway station. Thornford railway station is on the Heart of Wessex Line running between Bristol and Weymouth. Thornford is also served by Damory Coaches bus 74 running between Yeovil and Sherborne.There are four buses each way Monday to Friday and no buses run on Saturday nor Sundays

Thornford is mentioned in the Domesday Book where it is called Torneford and is listed as belonging to the Bishop of Salisbury. Archeological finds suggest Bronze Age or earlier inhabitation. A Roman villa has been excavated close to the village.

There are a number of Grade II listed buildings in the village, the centre of which, dominated by a Victorian clock tower, was designated a Conservation area in 1994. The most recent Grade II listing (in February 2008) is the British Telecom telephone box.
