= Yetminster =

Village in Dorset, England

Coordinates: 50.895°N 2.578°W

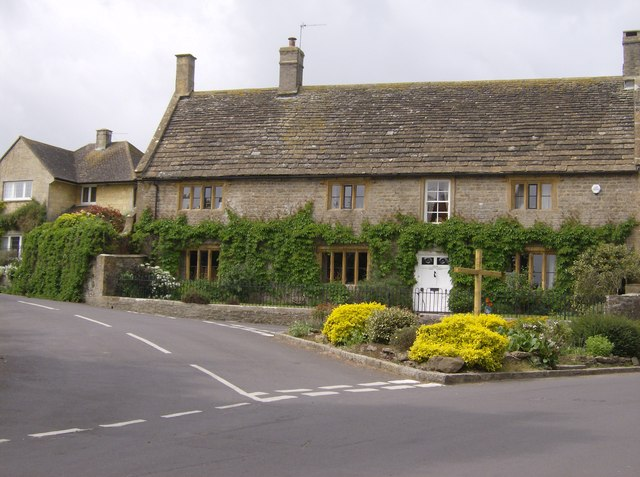
- Yetminster

- Location within Dorset
- Population: 1,105 (2011)
- OS grid reference: ST594108
- Unitary authority: Dorset
- Ceremonial county: Dorset
- Region: South West
- Country: England
- Sovereign state: United Kingdom
- Post town: SHERBORNE
- Postcode district: DT9
- Dialling code: 01935
- Police: Dorset
- Fire: Dorset and Wiltshire
- Ambulance: South Western
- UK Parliament: West Dorset

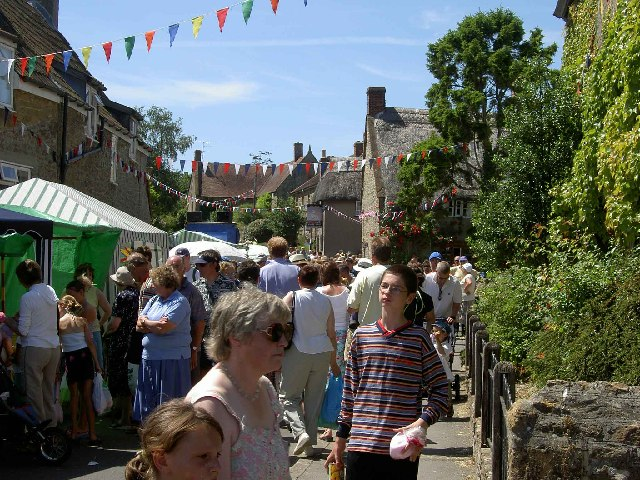
Yetminster Fair in 2003

Yetminster is a village and civil parish in the English county of Dorset. It lies 4 miles (6.4 km) south-west of Sherborne. It is sited on the River Wriggle, a tributary of the River Yeo, and is built almost entirely of honey-coloured limestone, which gives the village an appearance reminiscent of Cotswold villages. In the 2011 census the civil parish had a population of 1,105.

== History ==
In 1086 in the Domesday Book Yetminster was recorded as Etiminstre; it had 76 households, 26 ploughlands, 42 acres (17 ha) of meadow and 2 mills. It was in Yetminster Hundred and the tenant-in-chief was the Bishop of Salisbury.

The parish church of St Andrew has Saxon origins, though only part of a 10th-century standing cross remains from that period; the current building dates mostly from the mid-15th century, though the chancel was built around 1300 and the whole church was restored in 1890 and several times subsequently.

In 1300 the bishop of Salisbury founded a weekly market and three-day annual fair in the village. Records do not state whether the market thrived, but the fair continued until the 19th century. It was revived in the 20th century, and today takes place on the second Saturday in July.

Robert Boyle, pioneer of modern chemistry who is best known for Boyle's law, left an endowment for the provision of a school for poor boys in the district; the building was constructed in 1697 and functioned as a school between 1711 and 1945.

In the early 19th century, several buildings in the village accommodated a thriving dowlas industry. Records from 1848 indicate Yetminster's degree of self-sufficiency as a community; nearly 20 trades and crafts were conducted in the village, including a glazier, a saddler, several shoe and boot makers, a tailor and a maltster.

In 1857 the Wilts, Somerset and Weymouth Railway between Weymouth and Westbury opened; it passed through Yetminster and a station was built for the village.

Many of the buildings still standing in the village were built from the local limestone between the end of the 16th and the middle of the 18th centuries, resulting in an unusually unified architectural appearance. Writing in 1905 Sir Frederick Treves described the village as "probably the most consistent old-world village or townlet in the county", in 1965 Ralph Wightman stated that "Yetminster [...] is the nearest Dorset equivalent to the stone building of the Cotswold country", and in 1980 Roland Gant wrote that "little has come since to spoil this largish village."

== Governance ==
Yetminster is within an electoral ward that bears its name and includes Chetnole and the surrounding area. The population of this ward in the 2011 census was 1,564. The ward is one of 32 that comprise the West Dorset parliamentary constituency.

== Geography ==
Measured directly, Yetminster village is about 4 miles (6.4 km) southwest of Sherborne, 4 miles (6.4 km) southeast of Yeovil, 13.5 miles (21.7 km) northeast of Bridport and 14 miles (23 km) north-northwest of Dorchester.

The geology of the parish comprises a narrow central band of Middle Jurassic cornbrash limestone and Forest Marble that crosses the parish from west to east, with Upper Jurassic Oxford clay to the north and south. In the southeast and northeast the Oxford clay is overlain by Quaternary undifferentiated head deposits. The village is sited on the cornbrash.

== Demography ==
In the 2011 census Yetminster civil parish had 531 dwellings, 498 households and a population of 1,105. 29% of residents were age 65 or over, compared to 16.4% for England as a whole.

The population of the parish in the censuses between 1921 and 2001 is shown in the table below:

Census Population of Yetminster Parish 1921—2001 (except 1941)
Census	1921	1931	1951	1961	1971	1981	1991	2001
Population	522	438	573	576	810	900	990	1,080
Source:Dorset County Council

== Amenities ==
Yetminster does not lie on a main road and experiences mostly local traffic. It has its own railway station (on the Heart of Wessex Line), which is sited close to the village centre. St Andrews Church has a 300-year-old faceless clock which chimes the national anthem every three hours. As well as the expected local store and pub, Yetminster still possesses a variety of village amenities and services, including a GP surgery and health centre, and a sports/social club with playing grounds and tennis court.

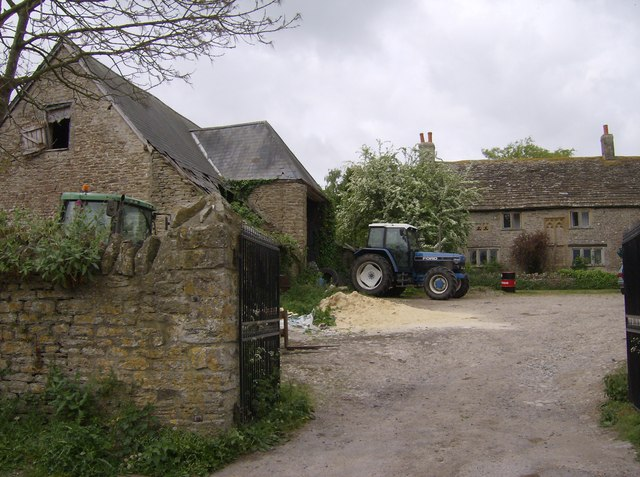
Upbury Farm, Church Street

== Notable people ==
Yetminster was the birthplace of Benjamin Jesty (c.1736–1816), a farmer who lived in the village for much of his life, who is notable for his early experiment in inducing immunity against smallpox using deliberate inoculation with the less virulent cowpox. Unlike Edward Jenner, a medical doctor who is given broad credit for developing the smallpox vaccine in 1796, Jesty did not publicise his findings, even though they were made some twenty years earlier in 1774. Only two people pre-dated Jesty's work. There is a blue plaque commemorating Jesty's pioneering work at Upbury Farm, near to the church.

English folk music group The Yetties met in the Yetminster Scout Group in the mid-1950s and took their name from the village.
