= Great Western Railway (train operating company) =

Train operating company in Great Britain

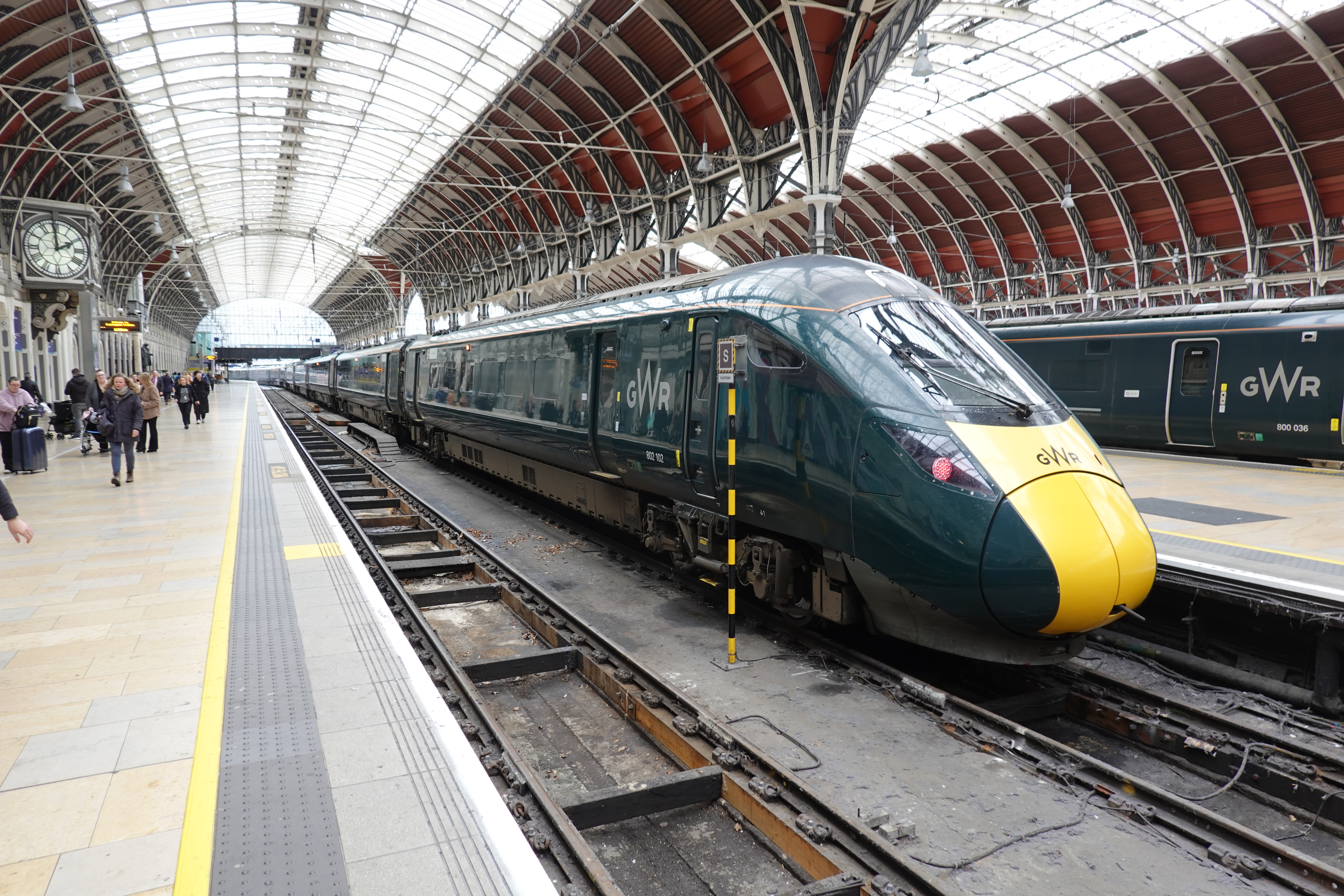
- Great Western Railway Class 802 at London Paddington

Overview
- Franchises: InterCity Great Western 4 February 1996 – 31 March 2006; Greater Western 1 April 2006 – 13 December 2026
- Main regions: Greater London; South East England; South West England; South Wales
- Other regions: East Midlands; West Midlands
- Fleet: Class 08 shunting locos; Class 57 diesel locomotives for Night Riviera; Class 150 Sprinter; Class 158 Express Sprinter; Class 165 Networker Turbo; Class 166 Networker Turbo; Class 175 Coradia 1000; Class 230 D-Train; Class 387 Electrostar; Class 800 IET; Class 802 IET
- Stations operated: 198
- Parent company: FirstGroup
- Headquarters: Swindon
- Reporting mark: GW
- Predecessor: First Great Western Link; Wessex Trains

Technical
- Track gauge: 1,435 mm (4 ft 8 1/2 in) standard gauge
- Electrification: 25 kV 50 Hz AC OHLE
- Length: 1,241 mi (1,997 km)

Other
- Website: www.gwr.com
System map

First Greater Western Ltd, trading as Great Western Railway (GWR), is a British train operating company owned by FirstGroup that provides services in the Greater Western franchise area. It manages 198 stations. GWR operates long-distance inter-city services along the Great Western Main Line to and from the West of England and South Wales, inter-city services from London to the West Country via the Reading–Taunton line, and the Night Riviera sleeper service between London and Penzance. It provides outer-suburban services in West London; commuter services from its London terminus at London Paddington to the Thames Valley region, including parts of Berkshire and Buckinghamshire, and Oxfordshire; and regional services throughout the West of England and South Wales to the South coast of England. Great Western Railway also serves two of London's airports: Heathrow, through its operation of the Heathrow Express service, and Gatwick, on its North Downs Line route. As of March 2025, GWR employed 6,449 staff and managed 198 stations on a 1,997 km (1,241 mi) network, which provided 89 million annual passenger journeys.

The company began operating in February 1996 as Great Western Trains, as part of the privatisation of British Rail. In December 1998, it became First Great Western after FirstGroup bought out its partners' shares in Great Western Holdings. In April 2006, First Great Western, First Great Western Link and Wessex Trains were combined into the new Greater Western franchise and brought under the First Great Western brand. The company adopted its current name and a new livery in September 2015 to coincide with the start of a newly extended contract that was subsequently extended to run until June 2028.

GWR is scheduled to return to public ownership on 13 December 2026 as part of the formation of Great British Railways.

== History ==
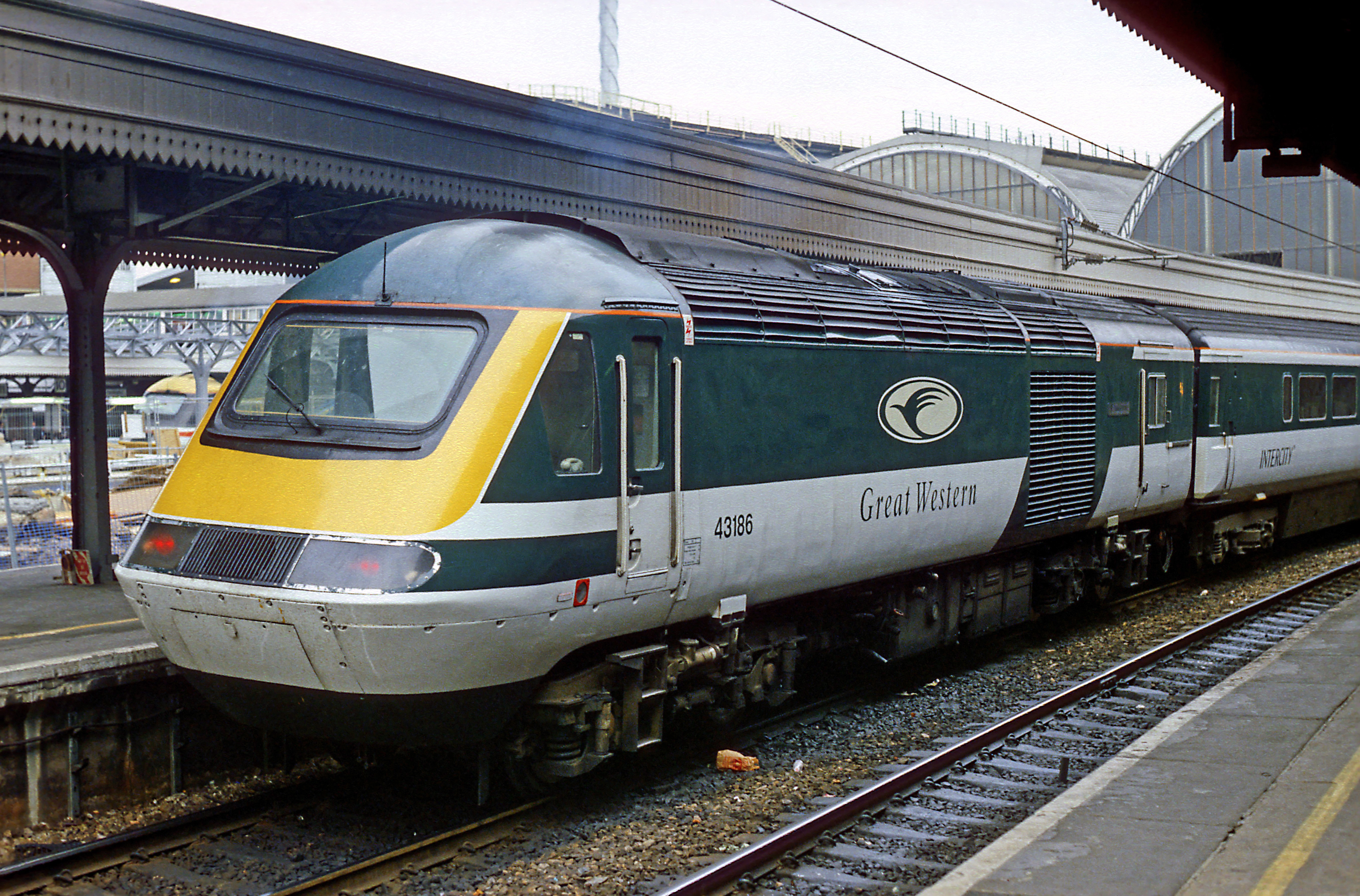
An InterCity 125 as operated by the original Great Western Trains franchise from 1996 to 1998

As part of the privatisation of British Rail, the Great Western InterCity franchise was awarded by the Director of Passenger Rail Franchising to Great Western Holdings in December 1995, and it began operations on 4 February 1996. Great Western Holdings was owned by some former British Rail managers (51%), FirstBus (24.5%) and 3i (24.5%).

In March 1998, FirstGroup bought out its partners' stakes to give it 100% ownership. In December 1998, the franchise was rebranded First Great Western.

On 1 April 2004, First Great Western Link began operating the Thames Trains franchise. It ran local services from Paddington to Slough, Henley-on-Thames, Reading, Didcot Parkway, Oxford, Newbury, Bedwyn, Worcester Shrub Hill, Hereford, Banbury and Stratford-upon-Avon. It also operated services from Reading to Gatwick Airport (via Guildford and Dorking), and from Reading to Basingstoke.

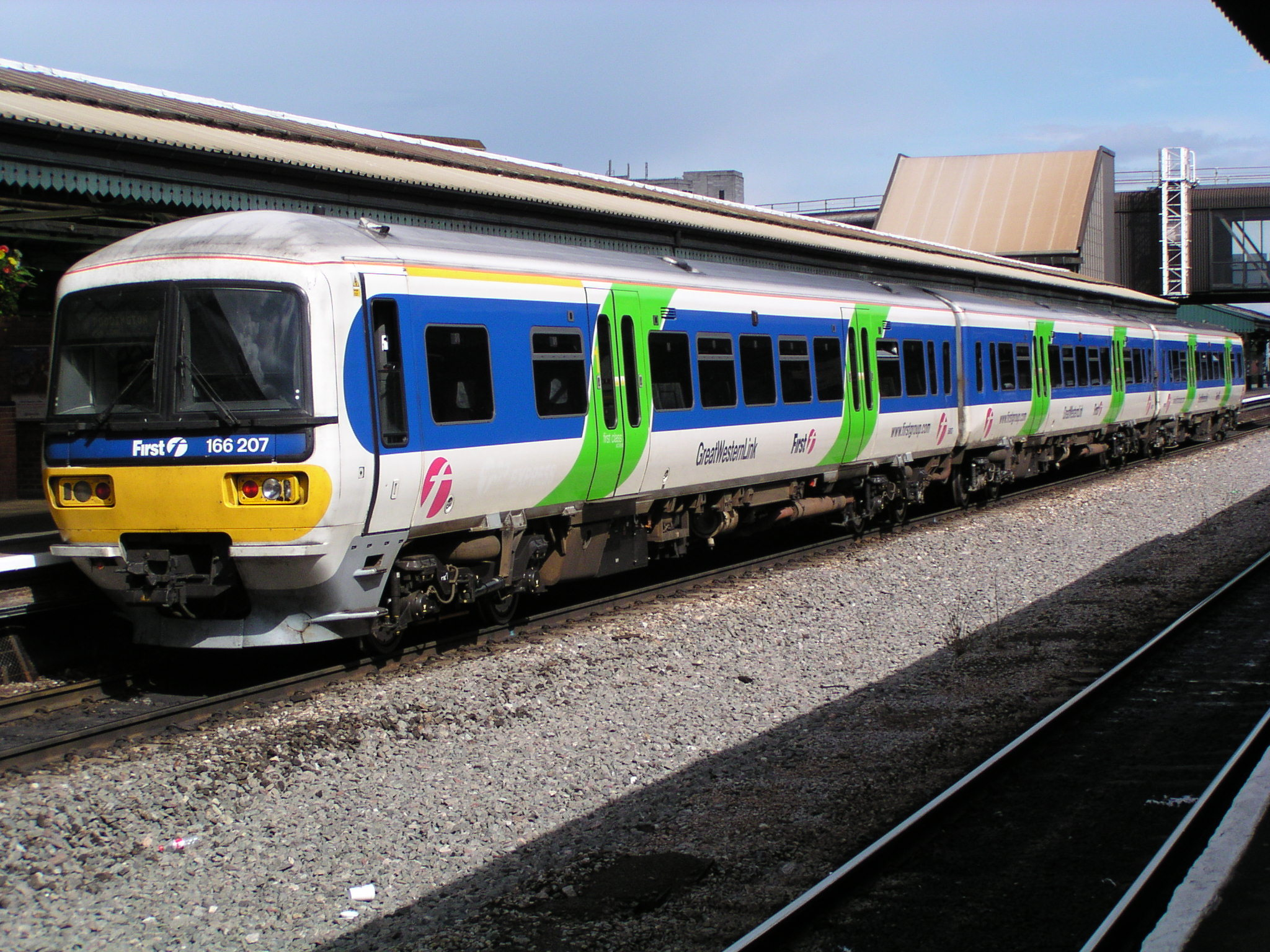
First Great Western Link operated the Thames Trains franchise from April 2004 until it was absorbed into the Greater Western franchise in 2006.

On 1 April 2006, the Great Western, Great Western Link and Wessex Trains franchises were combined into a new Greater Western franchise. FirstGroup, National Express and Stagecoach were shortlisted to bid for it. On 13 December 2005, it was announced that FirstGroup had won the franchise. Originally, First planned to subdivide its services into three categories based on routes. Following feedback from staff and stakeholders, the decision was taken to re-brand and re-livery all services as 'First Great Western'.

In May 2011, FirstGroup announced that it had decided not to take up the option to extend its franchise beyond the end of March 2013. It stated that, in the light of the £1 billion plan to electrify the Great Western route from London via Bristol to Cardiff, it wished to try to negotiate a longer-term deal. CEO Tim O'Toole said: "We believe we are best placed to manage these projects and capture the benefits through a longer-term franchise."

By not taking up the option to extend its original franchise contract for a further three years, FirstGroup avoided having to pay £826.6 million to the government; it received extra subsidies totalling £133 million from the government in 2010.

In March 2012, Arriva, FirstGroup, National Express and Stagecoach were shortlisted to bid for the new franchise. The winner was expected to be announced in December 2012, with the new franchisee taking over in April 2013. But it was announced in July 2012 that the franchise would be extended, due to the late issue of the invitation to tender (ITT). The ITT ran from the end of July until October 2012. The winner would have been announced in March 2013, and taken on the franchise from 21 July 2013 until the end of July 2028. The new franchise would include the introduction of new Intercity Express Trains, capacity enhancements and smart ticketing. The award of the franchise was again delayed in October 2012, while the Department for Transport (DfT) reviewed the way rail franchises were awarded.

In January 2013, the government announced that the current competition for the franchise had been aborted, and that FirstGroup's contract had been extended until October 2013. A two-year franchise extension until September 2015 was agreed in October 2013, and subsequently extended until March 2019. A further extension to April 2019 was granted in March 2015.

The refurbishment of first-class carriages in 2014 included interiors that featured a new GWR logo, with no First branding. The whole company was rebranded Great Western Railway (GWR) on 20 September 2015, with the introduction of a green livery in recognition of the former Great Western Railway which existed between 1835 and 1947. The new livery was introduced when HST interiors were refurbished, and on sleeper carriages and Class 57/6 locomotives.

In May 2018, TfL Rail – which later became the Elizabeth line – took over services from Paddington to Hayes & Harlington, and then some stopping services to Reading in December 2019, becoming part of the Elizabeth line service.

In March 2020, the DfT awarded a further extension to 31 March 2023.

In June 2022, the DfT replaced the franchise agreement with a direct award contract that expires on 25 June 2028, with an option to extend for a further three years.

GWR was one of several train operators impacted by the 2022–2024 United Kingdom railway strikes, which were the first national rail strikes in the UK for three decades.

GWR is scheduled to return to public ownership on 13 December 2026 as part of the foundation of Great British Railways.

== Routes ==
Great Western Railway operates routes west of London including those towards south west England such as Wiltshire, Bristol, Cornwall, Gloucestershire, as well as Oxfordshire, Berkshire, Hereford and South Wales.

The following is a simplified list of regular off-peak weekday service from the May 2026 timetables.

=== Intercity ===
London to South Wales
Route	tph	Calling at
London Paddington to Cardiff Central	1	Reading; Swindon; Bristol Parkway; Newport
London Paddington to Swansea	1	Reading; Swindon; Bristol Parkway; Newport; Cardiff Central; Bridgend; Port Talbot Parkway; Neath; Seven trains per day continue to Carmarthen mainly calling at Llanelli and Pembrey & Burry Port.
London to Bristol and Somerset
Route	tph	Calling at
London Paddington to Bristol Temple Meads	2	Reading; Didcot Parkway (1tph); Swindon; Chippenham; Bath Spa; One train every 2 hours continues towards Weston-super-Mare, calling at Nailsea and Backwell, Yatton and Worle.
London to Devon and Cornwall
Route	tph	Calling at
London Paddington to Exeter St Davids	1 tp 2h	Reading; Newbury; Hungerford; Pewsey; Westbury; Castle Cary; Taunton; Tiverton Parkway; Some trains continue to Paignton or Plymouth, calling at various intermediate stations.
London Paddington to Plymouth	1 tp 2h	Reading; Taunton; Tiverton Parkway; Exeter St Davids; Newton Abbot; Totnes; Alternates with services between London Paddington and Penzance to provide an hourly service on this route.
London Paddington to Penzance	1 tp 2h	Reading; Taunton; Tiverton Parkway; Exeter St Davids; Newton Abbot; Totnes; Plymouth; Liskeard; Bodmin Parkway; Par; St Austell; Truro; Redruth; Camborne; St Erth; Alternates with services between London Paddington and Plymouth to provide an hourly service between those stations.
London to Oxford and The Cotswolds
Route	tph	Calling at
London Paddington to Oxford	1	Reading; Didcot Parkway (Oxford-bound only)
London Paddington to Great Malvern	1	Reading; Didcot Parkway (London-bound only); Oxford; Hanborough; Charlbury; Kingham; Moreton-in-Marsh; Honeybourne; Evesham; Pershore; Worcestershire Parkway; Worcester Shrub Hill; Worcester Foregate Street; Malvern Link; Certain trains terminate at Worcester while others continue to Hereford calling at Colwall and Ledbury.
London Paddington to Cheltenham Spa	1	Reading; Didcot Parkway; Swindon; Kemble; Stroud; Stonehouse; Gloucester (Note: Trains reverse); One train per day continues to Worcester Shrub Hill calling at Ashchurch for Tewkesbury.

=== Thames Valley ===
Great Western Mainline
Route	tph	Calling at
London Paddington to Didcot Parkway	2	Slough; Maidenhead; Twyford; Reading; Tilehurst; Pangbourne; Goring & Streatley; Cholsey
Reading–Bedwyn Line
Route	tph	Calling at
London Paddington to Newbury	1	Reading; Theale; Thatcham
Reading to Newbury	1	Reading West; Theale; Aldermaston; Midgham; Thatcham; Newbury Racecourse
Newbury to Bedwyn	1	Kintbury; Hungerford; One train runs non-stop from Newbury to Bedwyn.
Greenford Branch
Route	tph	Calling at
West Ealing to Greenford	2	Drayton Green; Castle Bar Park; South Greenford
Windsor Branch
Route	tph	Calling at
Slough to Windsor & Eton Central	3	Shuttle service
Marlow Branch
Route	tph	Calling at
Maidenhead to Marlow	1	Furze Platt; Cookham; Bourne End
Regatta Line
Route	tph	Calling at
Twyford to Henley-on-Thames	2	Wargrave; Shiplake
North Downs Line
Route	tph	Calling at
Reading to Gatwick Airport	1	Wokingham; Crowthorne; Sandhurst; Blackwater; Farnborough North; North Camp; Ash; Guildford; Dorking Deepdene; Reigate; Redhill
Reading to Gatwick Airport	1	Wokingham; Blackwater; North Camp; Guildford; Shalford; Chilworth (1 tp 2h); Gomshall (1 tp 2h); Dorking West (1 tp 2h); Dorking Deepdene; Betchworth (1 tp 2h); Reigate; Redhill; Trains either serve Chilworth and Gomshall, or Dorking West and Betchworth.
Reading–Basingstoke Line
Route	tph	Calling at
Reading to Basingstoke	2	Reading West; Reading Green Park; Mortimer; Bramley
Oxford Canal Line
Route	tph	Calling at
Didcot Parkway to Oxford	1 tp 2h	Appleford; Culham; Radley
Didcot Parkway to Banbury	1 tp 2h	Culham; Radley; Oxford; Tackley; Heyford; Kings Sutton

=== Bristol ===
Great Western Mainline
Route	tph	Calling at
Bristol Temple Meads to Oxford	1 tp 2h	Bath Spa; Chippenham; Swindon
Wessex Mainline
Route	tph	Calling at
Cardiff Central to Portsmouth Harbour	1	Newport; Filton Abbey Wood; Bristol Temple Meads; Bath Spa; Bradford-on-Avon; Trowbridge; Westbury; Dilton Marsh (Note: Request stop); Warminster; Salisbury; Romsey; Southampton Central; Fareham; Cosham; Fratton; Portsmouth & Southsea
Bristol and Somerset
Route	tph	Calling at
Cardiff Central to Taunton	1	Newport; Severn Tunnel Junction; Patchway; Filton Abbey Wood; Bristol Temple Meads; Nailsea & Backwell; Yatton; Worle; Weston-super-Mare; Highbridge and Burnham; Bridgwater; Taunton; Most trains continue beyond Taunton to Tiverton Parkway and Exeter St Davids where they may further continue to Plymouth and Penzance. See West of England below for typical calling patterns.
Weston-super-Mare to Severn Beach	1	Weston Milton; Worle; Yatton; Nailsea and Backwell; Parson Street; Bedminster; Bristol Temple Meads; Lawrence Hill; Stapleton Road; Montpelier; Redland; Clifton Down; Sea Mills; Shirehampton; Portway Park & Ride; Avonmouth; St Andrews Road
Bristol Temple Meads to Avonmouth	1	Lawrence Hill; Stapleton Road; Montpelier; Redland; Clifton Down; Sea Mills; Shirehampton; Portway Park & Ride
Bristol Temple Meads to Filton Abbey Wood	1	Lawrence Hill; Stapleton Road; Ashley Down
Gloucester and the Heart of Wessex Line
Route	tph	Calling at
Gloucester to Weymouth	1 tp 2h	Yate; Bristol Parkway; Filton Abbey Wood; Bristol Temple Meads; Keynsham; Oldfield Park; Bath Spa; Bradford-on-Avon; Trowbridge; Westbury; Frome; Bruton; Castle Cary; Yeovil Pen Mill; Thornford (Note: Request stop); Yetminster; Chetnole; Maiden Newton; Dorchester West; Upwey; Alternates with services from Gloucester to Westbury to provide an hourly service between those stations
Gloucester to Westbury	1 tp 2h	Yate; Bristol Parkway; Filton Abbey Wood; Bristol Temple Meads; Keynsham; Oldfield Park; Bath Spa; Bradford-on-Avon; Trowbridge; Two trains per day continue to Frome; Alternates with services from Gloucester to Weymouth to provide an hourly service on this route
Worcester Foregate Street to Bristol Temple Meads	1	Worcester Shrub Hill; Ashchurch; Cheltenham Spa; Gloucester; Cam & Dursley; Yate; Bristol Parkway; Filton Abbey Wood
Bristol Temple Meads to Salisbury	1	Keynsham; Oldfield Park; Bath Spa; Freshford; Avoncliff; Bradford-on-Avon; Trowbridge; Westbury; Warminster; Some services terminate at Warminster
Trans-Wilts Line
Route	tph	Calling at
Swindon to Westbury	1 tp 2h	Chippenham; Melksham; Trowbridge

=== West of England ===
South Devon and Cornish Mainline
Route	tph	Calling at
Exeter St Davids to Penzance	1	Dawlish (1 tp 2h); Teignmouth (1 tp 2h); Newton Abbot; Totnes; Ivybridge (1 tp 2h); Plymouth; St Budeaux Ferry Road (limited); Saltash; St Germans; Menheniot (limited); Liskeard; Bodmin Parkway; Lostwithiel; Par; St Austell; Truro; Redruth; Camborne; Hayle; St Erth; These trains operate between either Exeter St Davids or Plymouth and Penzance. Some services run north of Exeter to and from Cardiff Central; see Bristol above for typical calling patterns. The service pattern is erratic to fit between GWR InterCity and CrossCountry service but typically provides 1 local train per hour between Plymouth and Penzance.
Avocet and Riviera Lines
Route	tph	Calling at
Exmouth to Paignton	2	Lympstone Village; Lympstone Commando (1tph); Exton (1tph); Topsham; Newcourt; Digby & Sowton; Polsloe Bridge (1tph); St James Park (1tph); Exeter Central; Exeter St Davids; Exeter St Thomas (1tph); Marsh Barton (1tph); Starcross (1tph); Dawlish Warren (1tph); Dawlish; Teignmouth; Newton Abbot; Torre; Torquay; Trains either serve Lympstone Commando, Exton, Polsloe Bridge, and St James Park, or Exeter St Thomas, Marsh Barton, Starcross, and Dawlish Warren.
Dartmoor and Tarka Lines
Route	tph	Calling at
Exeter Central to Okehampton	1	Exeter St Davids; Newton St Cyres (limited); Crediton; Okehampton Interchange
Exeter Central to Barnstaple	1	Exeter St Davids; Newton St Cyres (limited); Crediton; Yeoford; Copplestone; Morchard Road; Lapford (limited); Eggesford; Kings Nympton (limited); Portsmouth Arms (limited); Umberleigh; Chapelton (limited); One train per day continues from Exeter Central to Axminster, calling at; Pinhoe; Cranbrook; Feniton; and Honiton .
Tamar Valley Line
Route	tph	Calling at
Plymouth to Gunnislake	1 tp 2h	Devonport; Dockyard; Keyham; St Budeaux Victoria Road; Bere Ferrers; Bere Alston; Calstock
Looe Valley Line
Route	tph	Calling at
Liskeard to Looe	1	Coombe Junction Halt (2 trains every day); St Keyne Wishing Well Halt; Causeland; Sandplace; Some trains runs non-stop between Liskeard and Looe.
Atlantic Coast Line
Route	tph	Calling at
Par to Newquay	1	Luxulyan (1 tp 2h); Bugle (1 tp 2h); Roche (1 tp 2h); St Columb Road (1 tp 2h); Quintrell Downs; Trains either call (on request) at Luxulyan, Bugle and Roche, or St Columb Road
Maritime Line
Route	tph	Calling at
Truro to Falmouth Docks	2	Perranwell (1tph); Penryn; Penmere; Falmouth Town
St Ives Bay Line
Route	tph	Calling at
St Erth to St Ives	2	Lelant Saltings (1 train every day); Lelant (1 tp 2h); Carbis Bay

== Named trains ==
Great Western Railway's named passenger trains include:

Name	Origin	Destination
The Armada	Plymouth	London Paddington
The Atlantic Coast Express	London Paddington	Newquay
The Bristolian	London Paddington	Bristol Temple Meads
The Capitals United	Swansea	London Paddington
The Cathedrals Express	Hereford	London Paddington
The Cheltenham Spa Express	London Paddington	Cheltenham Spa
The Cornishman	Penzance	London Paddington
The Cornish Riviera	London Paddington	Penzance
Cotswolds and Malvern Express	London Paddington	Hereford
The Devon Express	London Paddington	Paignton
The Flying Carolean	London Paddington	Swansea
The Golden Hind	Penzance	London Paddington
The Mayflower	London Paddington	Plymouth
The Merchant Venturer	London Paddington	Bristol Temple Meads or Weston-super-Mare
The Night Riviera	London Paddington	Penzance
The Pembroke Coast Express	London Paddington	Pembroke Dock
The Red Dragon	London Paddington	Carmarthen
The Royal Duchy	London Paddington	Penzance
The Saint David	London Paddington	Swansea
The Torbay Express	London Paddington	Paignton
Y Cymro – The Welshman	Swansea	London Paddington

== Onboard services ==
=== Pullman Dining ===
GWR operates restaurant cars on certain West Country and Wales trains to or from London Paddington. They are available to first-class and standard-class passengers, though only first-class passengers may make advance reservations, and they have priority over seats in the restaurant. Meals in the restaurant car are not included in the price of rail tickets.

=== First class ===
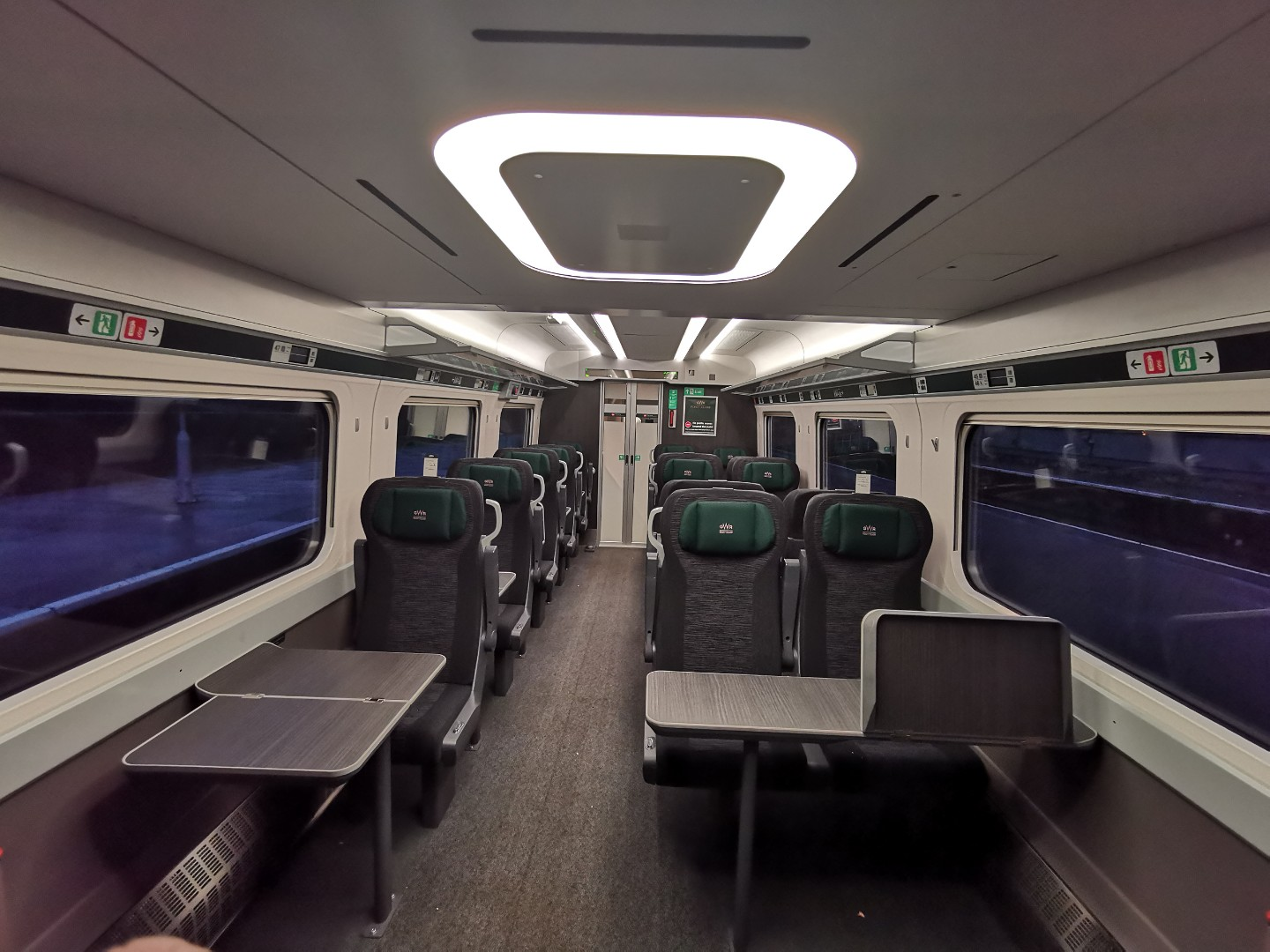
First class interior on a GWR Intercity Express Train

GWR has first class on all its long-distance high-speed services. First class on the IETs includes fabric reclining seating with tables at every seat, as well as an at-seat service provided by a customer host on most journeys. Unlike the previous HSTs, the IETs do not have leather first-class seating due to fire regulations. Like the HSTs, there are power sockets and USB charging points at every seat. There is Wi-Fi throughout the first class-carriages, which GWR describes as 'upgraded'.

=== Standard class ===
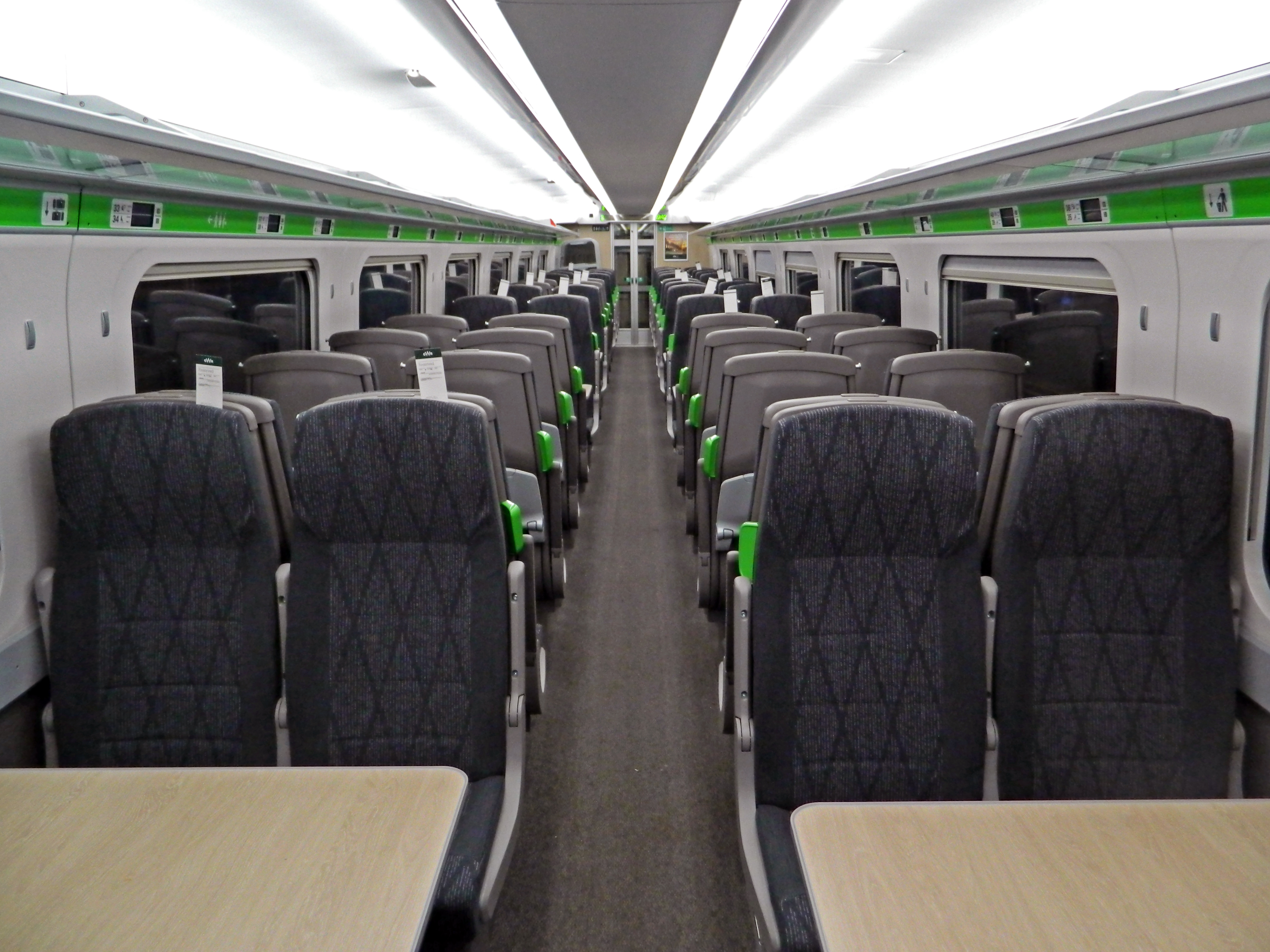
Standard-class interior on a GWR Intercity Express Train

Standard class is provided on all services. Many services on long-distance and regional routes have specific seat reservations.

=== Trolley service ===
An at-seat trolley service is scheduled to operate on most IET services, with a trolley in each portion of a ten-coach train. This is different from the HSTs, which had buffet counters branded as 'Express Cafes'.

== Performance ==
=== Disabled passengers ===
In July 2018, a disabled woman was threatened by Great Western Railway staff with police action and removal from the train she was travelling in, for using a disabled space for her mobility scooter. Canadian-born comedian Tanyalee Davis, who has a form of dwarfism, said she was humiliated when a Great Western Railway conductor made an announcement that she was "causing problems" which had delayed the train. The incident occurred after a woman travelling with a young child demanded that Davis make way for her pram. GWR said the incident should not have happened and "No one travelling with us should be left feeling like this".

=== Strike action ===
In 2015, the imminent arrival of the new Class 800 trains provoked a series of strikes by the RMT union over who has the right to control the doors. First Great Western wanted to replace conductors with driver-only operation (DOO); however, following several discussions it was agreed to keep conductors on all IET services. Another strike took place in early December 2016 amidst a background of ongoing rail strikes on a national level. The RMT ballotted Servest UK workers employed on an outsourcing contract to GWR as cleaners; the ballot passed in favour of strike action by 98%. A disruptive transfer period in the outsourcing contract, from Mitie to Servest UK, had resulted in what the RMT referred to as the creation of a "two-tier workforce" amongst cleaners at GWR, with an inequality in pay and working conditions between cleaners employed directly by GWR and those outsourced to Servest UK. Two 24-hour strikes were held from 06:00 on 16 and 23 December, followed by a 48-hour strike from 06:00 on 19 January 2017. Further industrial action was suspended by the RMT following the January strike as a result of an improvement in ongoing negotiations between the RMT, GWR and Servest UK. The dispute was formally resolved in July 2017, as RMT members voted in favour of accepting a new pay deal.

=== IET faults ===
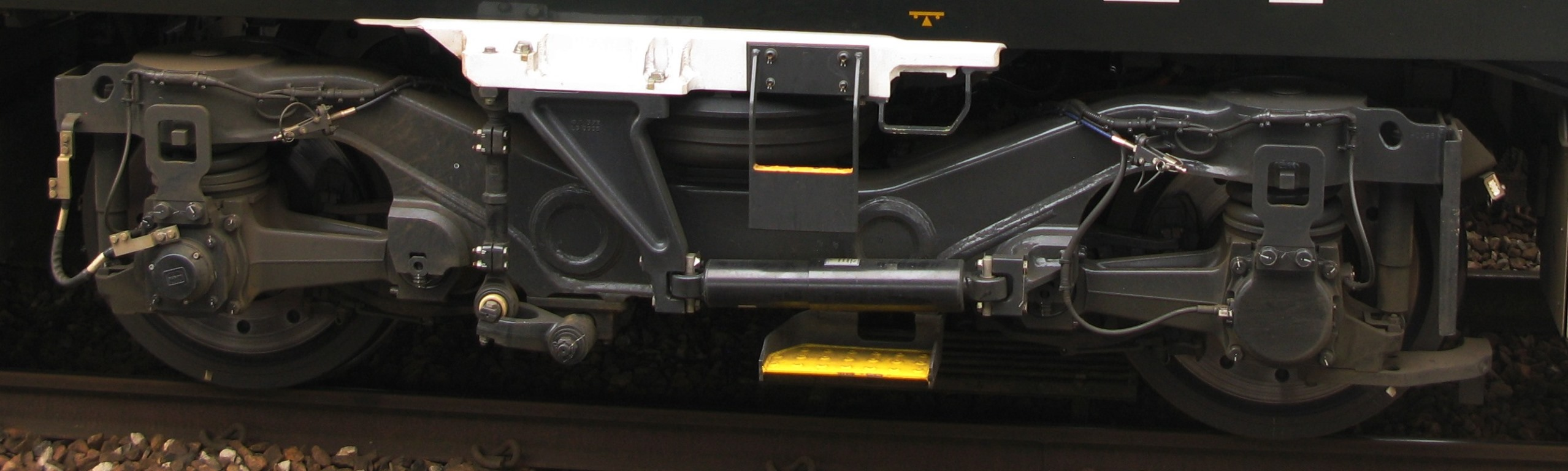
A Class 800 bogie. The white casting at the top is attached to the body. The triangular yaw damper bracket is on the left and the lifting pad is at the top of the square fixture to the right.

In April 2021, cracks were discovered in the yaw damper brackets (part of the suspension system) of Class 800 and 802 InterCity Express Trains (IET). Eight trains were withdrawn from service and an investigation started into the cause. All IETs and similar trains operated by other companies were taken out of service on 8 May 2021. Cracks had now been found in the lifting pads (a component fixed near the bogie) and it was feared that if these were to fall off they may cause injury or derailment. The only IET units that were permitted to operate were those which had been carefully inspected and found to have no significant cracks. This meant that most of GWR's 93 units were unavailable which led to significant disruption to long-distance services. Class 387 units operated additional services from London Paddington to Didcot Parkway which were later extended to Swindon and Bristol Parkway after approval was given for them to operate in service on this route. Three additional 387 units were loaned from c2c and were modified to work with GWR's fleet, mostly on services to Newbury. CrossCountry operated a service on behalf of GWR from Swindon to Bristol Temple Meads and the few available IETs were concentrated on services west of Swindon and to Plymouth. Plans were agreed on 13 May to increase inspections of the lifting pads and yaw dampers so that more trains could be returned to service. A further six Class 387 units were loaned from Govia Thameslink Railway in July 2021 and used in a common pool with GWR's existing 387/1 fleet, being surplus to requirements while the Gatwick Express service was suspended.

The majority of GWR IET units had problems with their fuel pumps in late 2025 which meant a lot of the generator units (GU) had to be isolated on the trains. 5 car units have 3 GUs each and 9 car units have 5 GUs each. On some sets multiple GUs were isolated. An emergency timetable was not put into place but the reduced power when GUs were isolated did have an impact on punctuality of diesel operated services for a while.

== Rolling stock ==
Great Western Railway inherited a fleet of InterCity 125 sets (Class 43 power cars and Mark 3 Coaches) and Class 57 locomotives and Mark 3 sleeper coaches from BR. In 2006, it added a fleet of Class 165 and Class 166 units from First Great Western Link, and a fleet of Class 150, Class 153 and Class 158 units from Wessex Trains.

=== Inter-City services ===
==== Class 800 Intercity Express Train ====
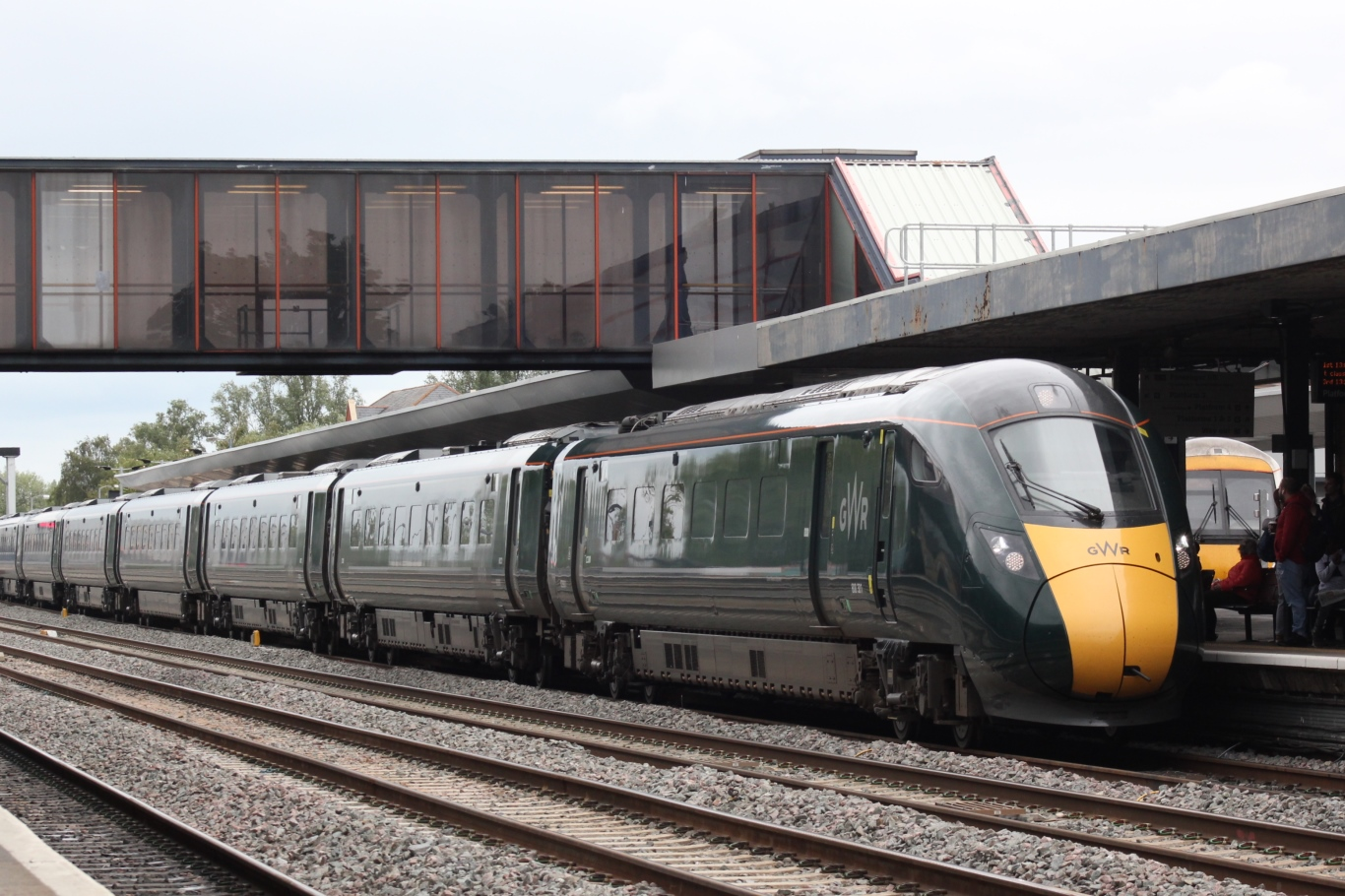
Class 800 at Oxford

The fleet of 57 Class 800 trains from the Hitachi A-train family is used to operate most of GWR's long-distance services between London and destinations such as Swindon, Chippenham, Bath Spa, Bristol Temple Meads, Newport, Cardiff Central, Swansea, Carmarthen, Cheltenham Spa, Oxford, Worcester Shrub Hill and Hereford. Introduced between autumn 2017 and spring 2019, these gradually replaced the older InterCity 125 sets.

On 28 April 2021, six Class 800s were withdrawn from service due to cracks being found during maintenance and were sent to Hitachi for inspection.

==== Class 802 Intercity Express Train ====
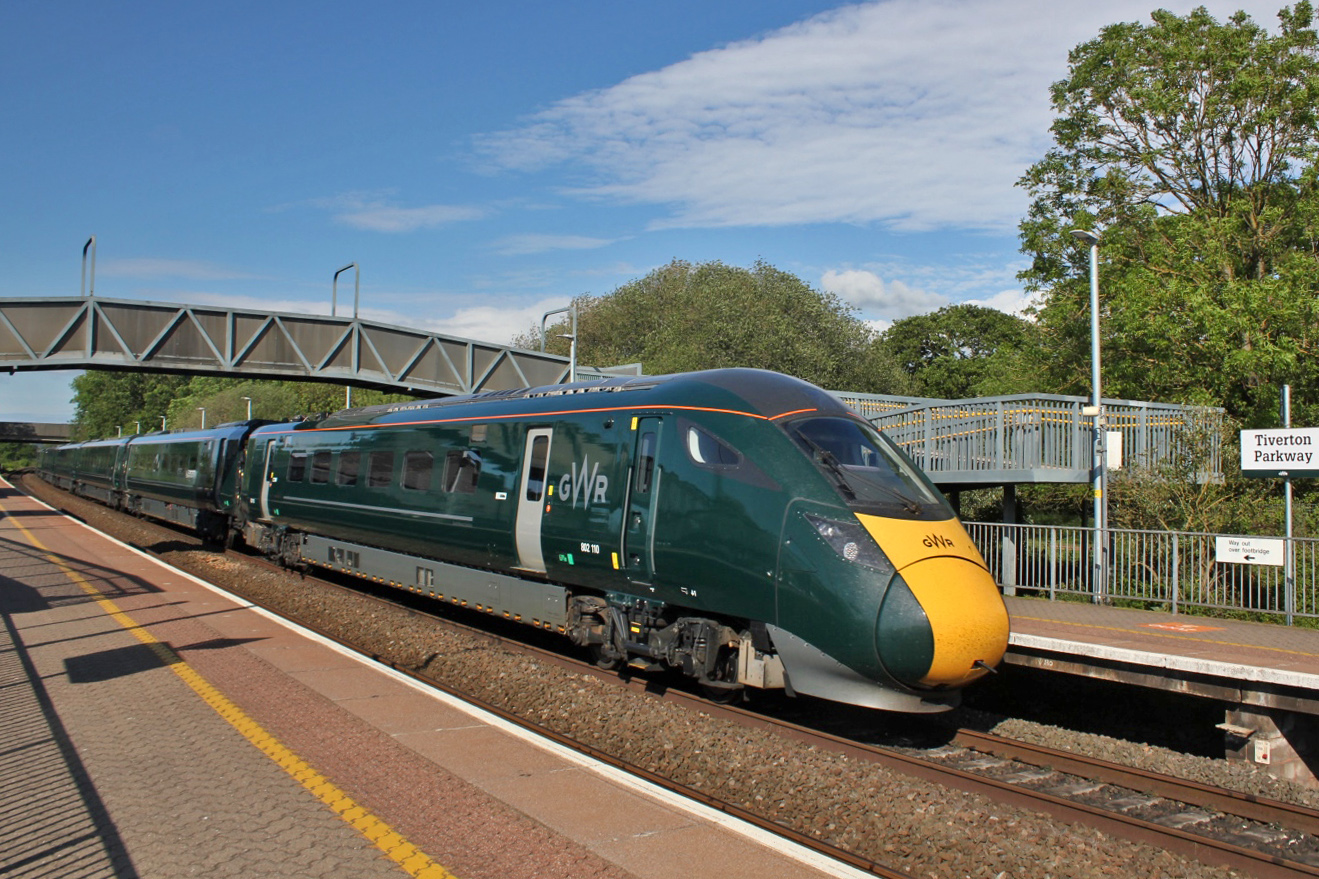
Class 802 at Tiverton Parkway

Long-distance services between London and destinations in the west of the GWR network (such as Paignton, Newquay, Plymouth and Penzance) are mostly operated using the fleet of 36 Class 802 trains, the first of which was introduced on 20 August 2018.

These trains are almost identical to the Class 800 trains, except they have a higher engine operating power—700 kW (940 hp) per engine as opposed to 560 kW (750 hp)—and are fitted with larger fuel tanks to cope with the gradients and extended running in diesel mode on the long unelectrified stretches in Devon and Cornwall.

Hitachi planned to test a tri-mode Class 802 in 2022 fitted with batteries in an attempt to reduce emissions when entering and leaving stations.

=== Sleeper services ===
==== Class 57 + Mark 3 ====
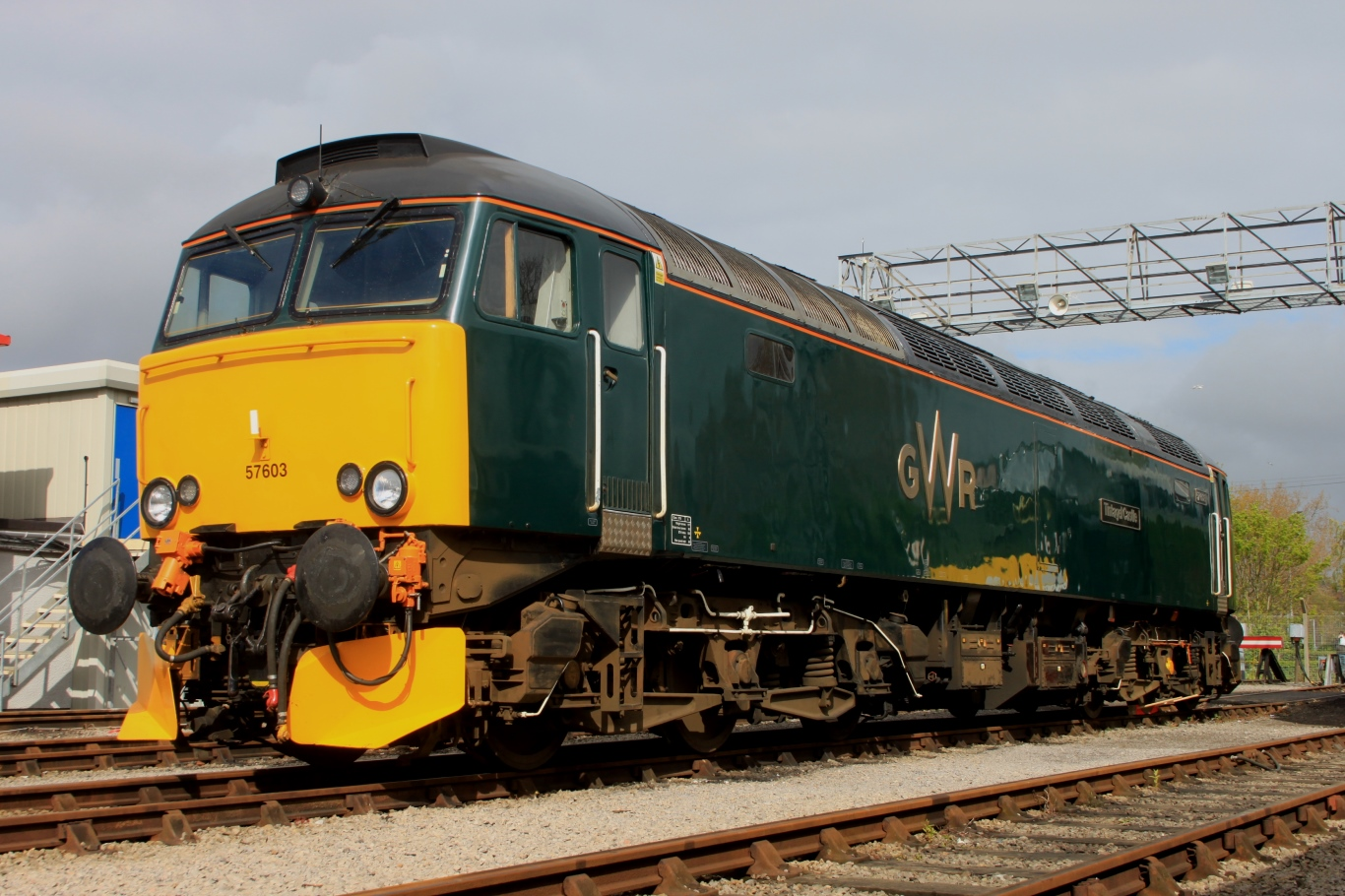
Class 57 locomotive at St Philip's Marsh depot

Four Class 57/6 locomotives have hauled the Night Riviera sleeper services since 2004 when they replaced Class 47s. Due to poor availability of the 57/6s, Direct Rail Services (DRS) Class 57/3s have been hired from Direct Rail Services. in 2023, former DRS 57312 was placed on permanent lease with GWR.

=== Thames Valley and Bristol services ===
==== Class 165/1 Networker Turbo ====
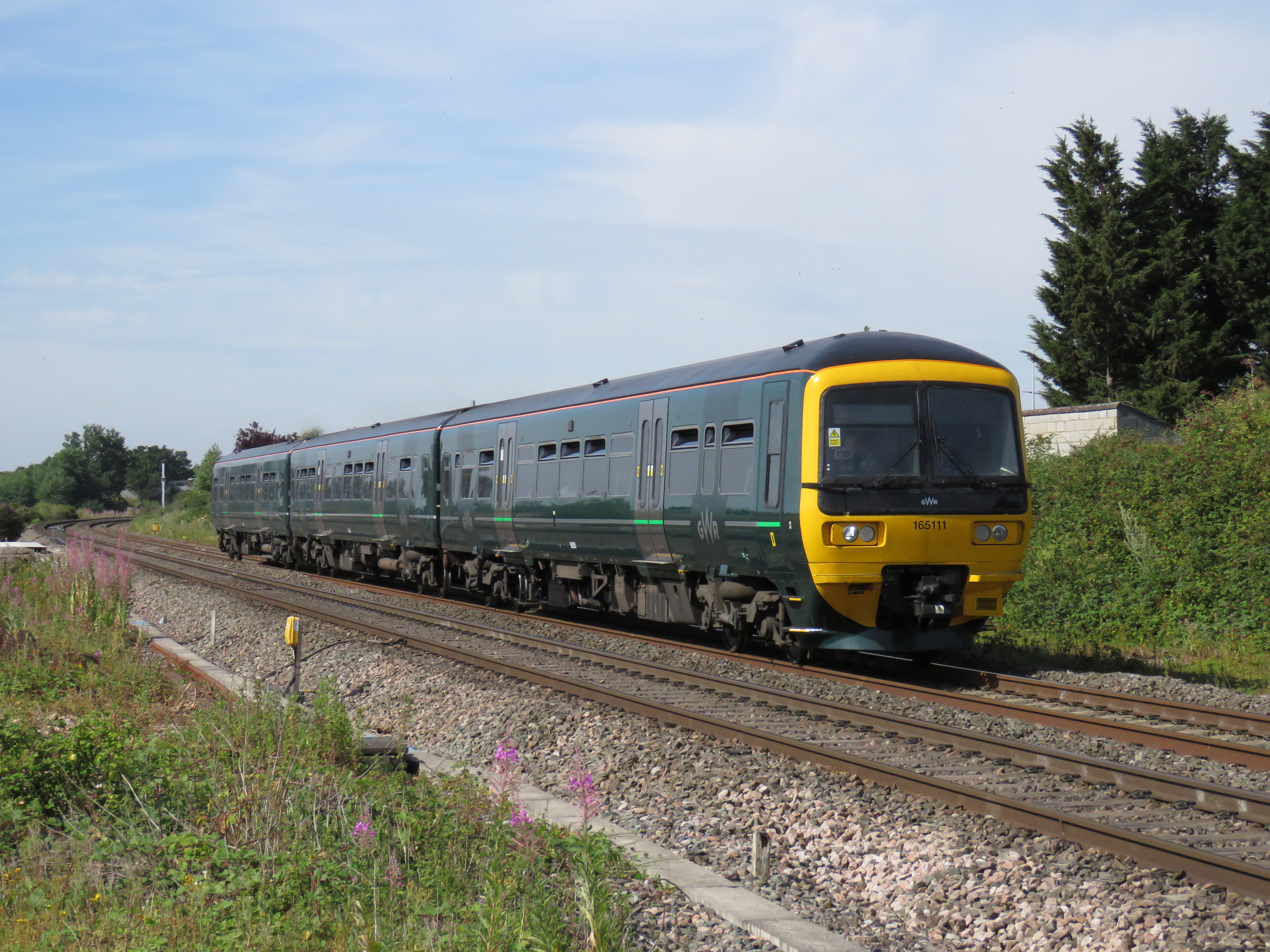
Class 165 on Basingstoke service

The Class 165 "Networker Turbo" is a two- or three-coach DMU originally used on shorter-distance services in the Thames Valley area, with many still based at Reading Traction Maintenance Depot. In this area, they are mainly used on branches such as the Greenford branch line, Slough–Windsor & Eton line, Marlow branch line and Henley branch line. They are also used on services between Reading and Basingstoke, Didcot Parkway and Oxford or Banbury, and sometimes services between London and Oxford. Many are based at St Philip's Marsh depot in Bristol, where they work on most of the lines in the area including the Severn Beach line, Heart of Wessex Line, Golden Valley line and Bristol to Exeter line. From summer 2018, they began operating services between Cardiff Central and Portsmouth Harbour too, in tandem with the Class 166 fleet. In response to its Remedial Plan Notice, First Great Western undertook a more thorough refurbishment of the Thames Turbo fleet than originally planned: the trains were to be fitted with improved lighting, carpets, toilets, and a revised seating layout. This refurbishment started in September 2016.

==== Class 166 Networker Turbo ====
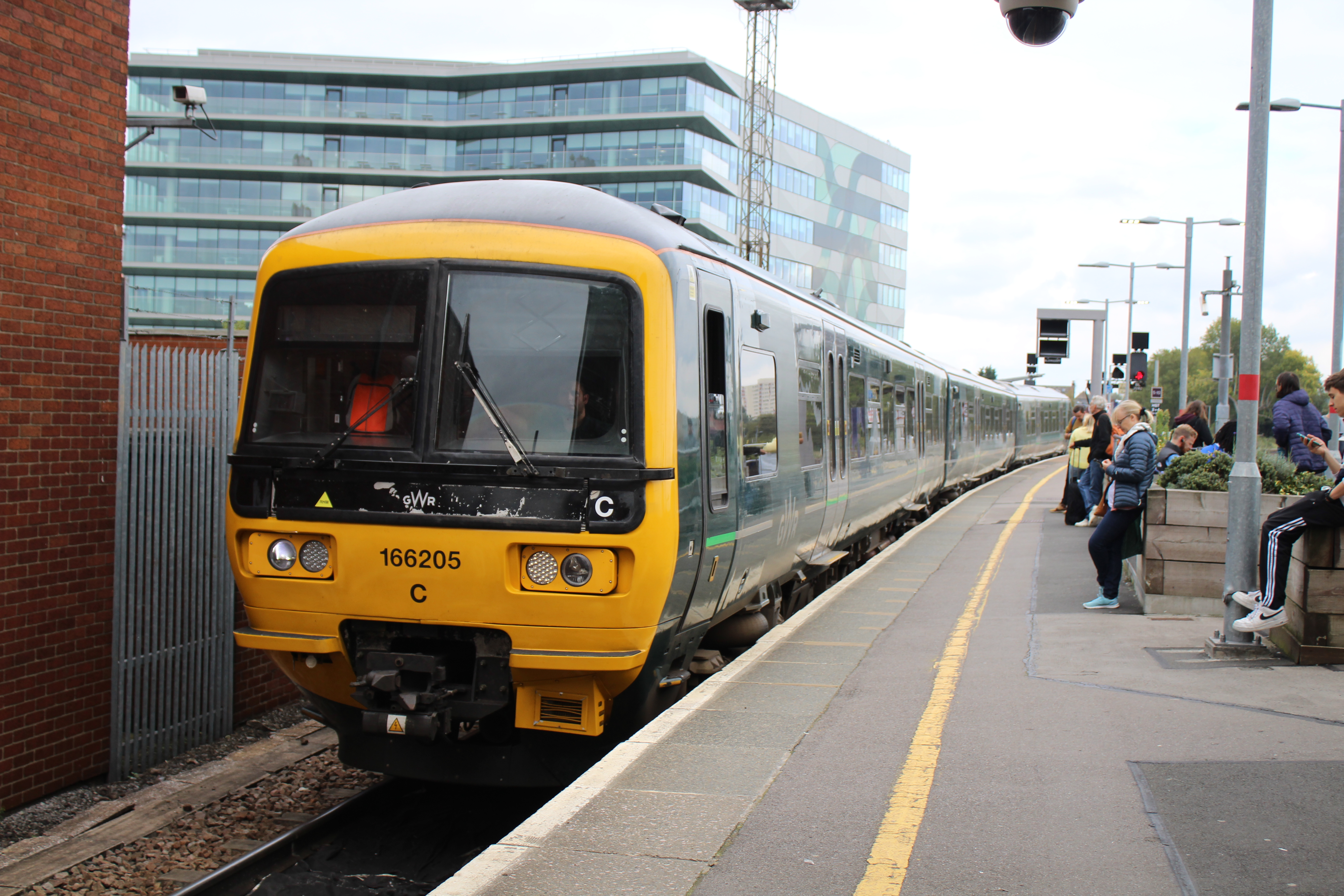
Class 166 at Bristol Temple Meads

The Class 166 "Networker Turbo" is a three-coach DMU, similar to the Class 165 units but with an internal layout more suitable for longer-distance services. They are now mostly based at St Philip's Marsh depot in Bristol, where they currently work on most of the lines in the area including the Wessex Main Line, Severn Beach line, Heart of Wessex Line, Golden Valley line and Bristol to Taunton line. These units also work the Paignton to Exmouth line.

==== Class 230 D-Train ====
In February 2023, GWR purchased a number of assets from the administrators of battery train manufacturer Vivarail, including 67 former London Underground D78 Stock carriages, intellectual property rights to the Class 230, and employed nine Vivarail staff. Since 31 January 2026, Class 230 unit 001 has been run in passenger service on the Greenford branch line between West Ealing and Greenford on Saturdays, alongside Class 165 units.

The battery-electric multiple unit, which had been trialled by GWR on the line for roughly two years, achieved the longest distance of any BEMU on a single charge (200.5 miles) to commemorate the 200th anniversary of the railways.

==== Class 387/1 Electrostar ====
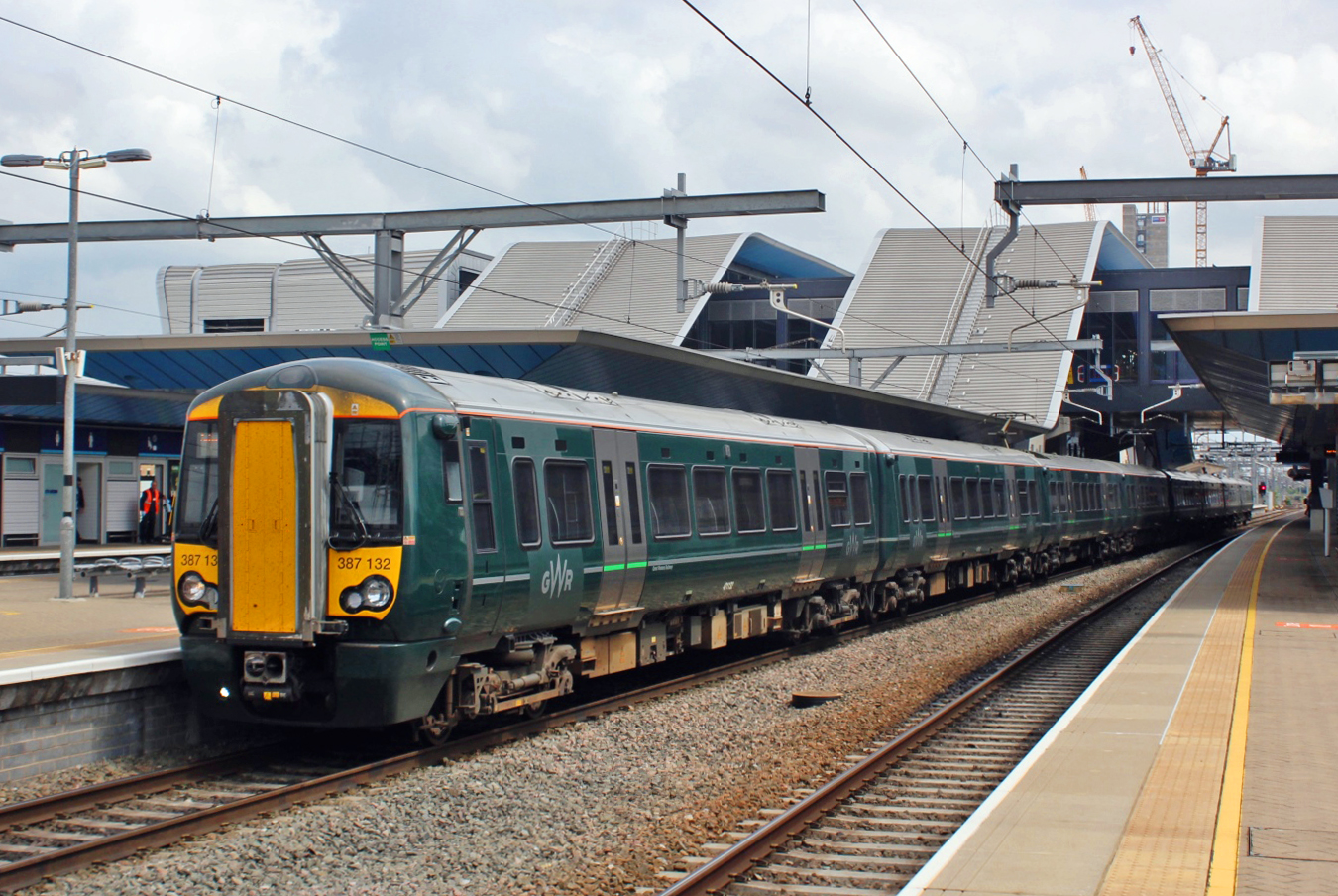
Class 387 at Reading

The Class 387 "Electrostar" is a four-coach EMU built by Bombardier, with a 2+2 seating layout, tables, power sockets and free Wi-Fi. It can be operated in four, eight- and twelve-coach formations. The class began to enter service in September 2016 on weekday peak services between London Paddington and Hayes & Harlington, using the overhead electrical equipment used by Heathrow Express. Services using the class were extended to Maidenhead in May 2017 and later to Didcot Parkway, and from Reading to Newbury.

Bombardier Transportation at Ilford Depot had modified twelve of these trains by December 2020, installing new first-class seating, Wi-Fi, luggage racks and on-board entertainment, to be used on Heathrow Express services. Rebranded as "Heathrow Express", and refurbished with Heathrow Express moquette, they replaced the existing Class 332, entering service on 29 December 2020.

In 2023 3 units were cascaded to Great Northern.

=== West of England services ===
==== Class 150/2 Sprinter ====
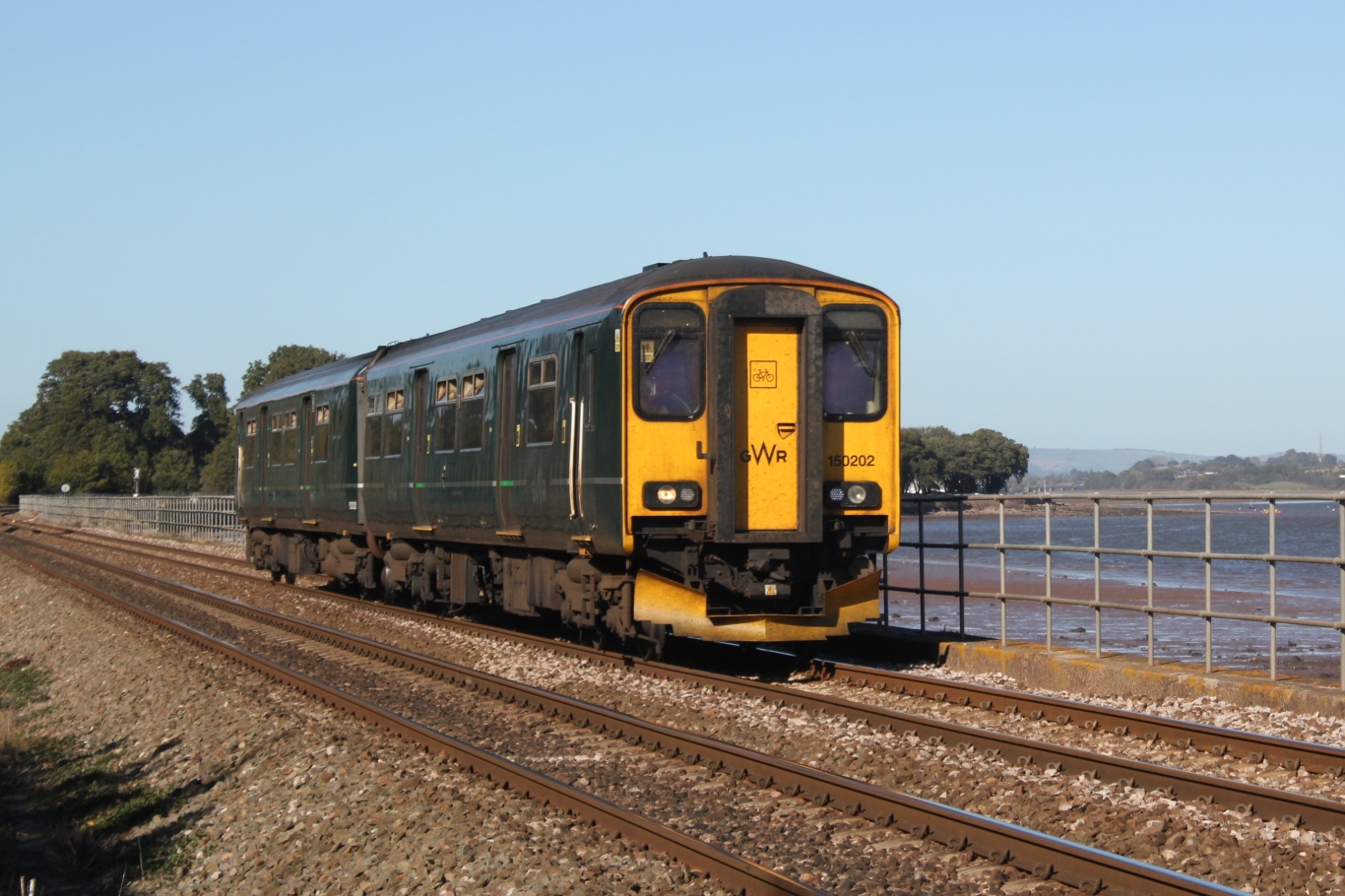
Class 150/2 skirting the Exe estuary

The fleet of 17 two-coach Class 150 Sprinter units was inherited from Wessex Trains as part of the Greater Western franchise shuffle. The fleet had been refurbished by Wessex Trains in 2003, with 2+2 seating arranged in a mixture of 'airline' (face to back) and table seating. The fleet is widespread throughout the former Wessex area, and carried a maroon livery with advertising vinyls for South West Tourism. Each unit was sponsored by a district, town or attraction and carried a unique livery. Most received names of attractions, places and branch lines. Two units were repainted into the new First 'Local' livery, but all units are now due to receive the new green GWR livery. As part of a national fleet shuffle, eight units went to Arriva Trains Wales on 10 December 2006, and were replaced with 8 Class 158 units.

First Great Western received five extra Class 150/2 units in May 2007 as part of its Remedial Plan Notice, to enable three-car Class 158 trains to operate on the Portsmouth-Cardiff services. Five Class 150 sets were hired from Arriva Trains Wales from March 2008 until they were returned in November 2010.

==== Class 158 Express Sprinter ====
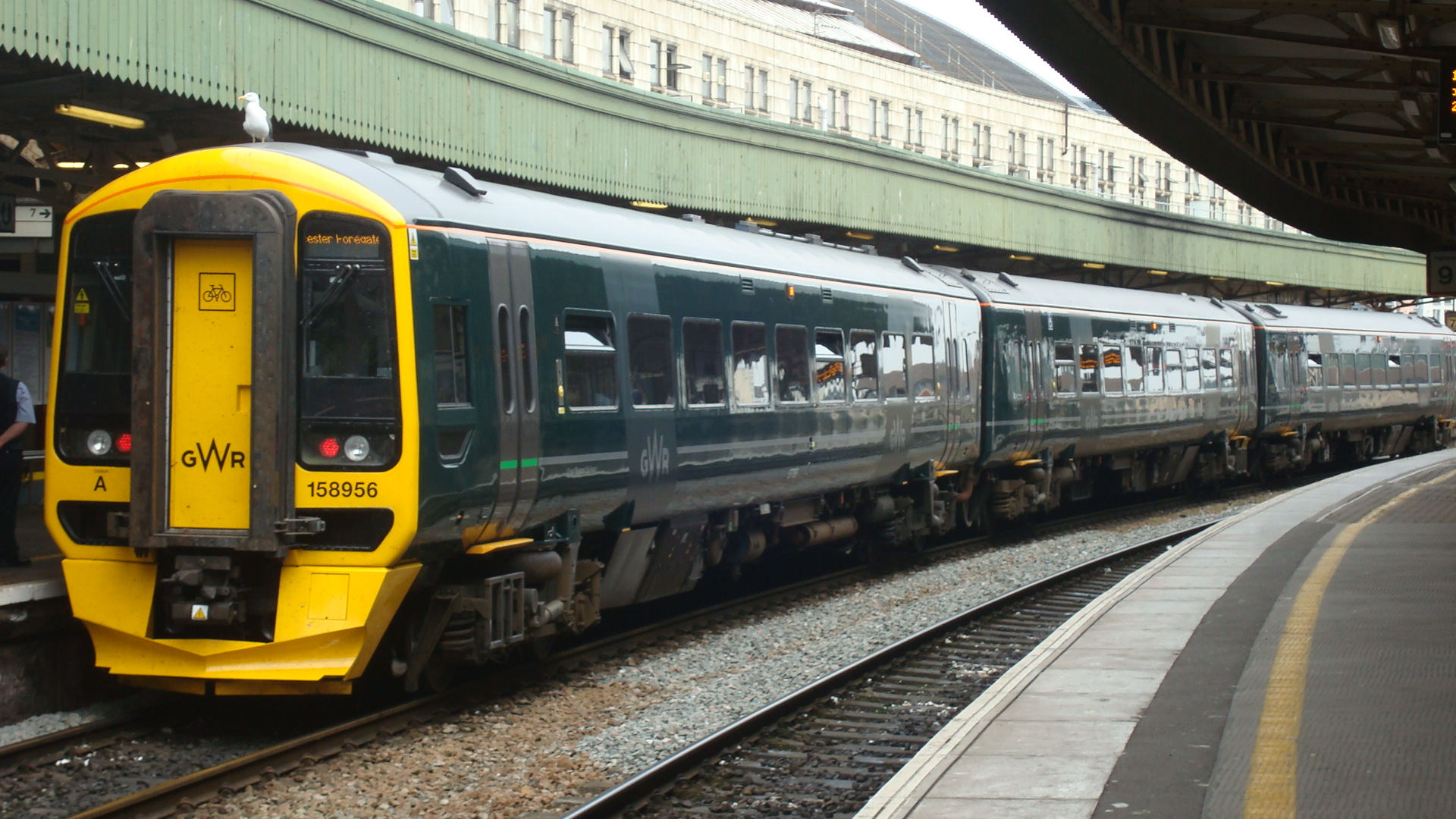
Class 158 at Bristol Temple Meads

The Class 158 is a two- or three-coach DMU used on regional express services in the former Wessex Trains area. In February 2008, as part of its Remedial Plan Notice, First Great Western announced that it would form some hybrid three-car Class 158 units in March 2008, made possible by the transfer of five Class 150/2 units from Arriva Trains Wales. This allowed for ten hybrid units in operation and, combined with one non-hybrid three-car unit, provided eleven three-car units to operate services between Portsmouth and Cardiff and Great Malvern and Weymouth alongside the two-car units. After the introduction of Class 150/1 trains from London Overground and London Midland, three of the remaining five two-coach Class 158s were reformed to provide two further three-coach Class 158s. However, following their operations largely being taken over by Class 165 and Class 166 units in the Bristol area, most of these units were reformed to restore them to 2 coach formation.

The fleet was refurbished in a programme begun in 2007, which included fitting of reupholstered seats, new lighting and floor coverings, CCTV within the passenger saloons, and refurbished toilets. At the same time, the exteriors of the vehicles were repainted in the updated FGW livery, including artwork depicting various local places of interest. The refurbishment work took place at the Wabtec plant in Doncaster.

In 2018, the 158s began running alongside the first completed Class 255 Castle set on services between Bristol, Exeter, Plymouth and Penzance. Since then, more of the 158 fleet have gradually started to move more west with more 158 sets working services between Exmouth and Paignton / Barnstaple. The timetable change in December 2019 saw the start of the 158s taking over from the 143s primarily on the Tarka Line to Barnstaple, with some of the units also working on the Cardiff / Bristol to Penzance route alongside the Castle sets.

In October 2020, Arriva TrainCare completed a refurbishment of the Class 158 fleet in line with the C6 exam at their Bristol Barton Hill depot. This included: full interior and exterior repaint, and rebrand to new GWR corporate colours, installation of new air conditioning system and heaters and overhauling the seating and flooring. In addition, a new passenger information system was installed as well as new toilet systems.

==== Class 175 ====
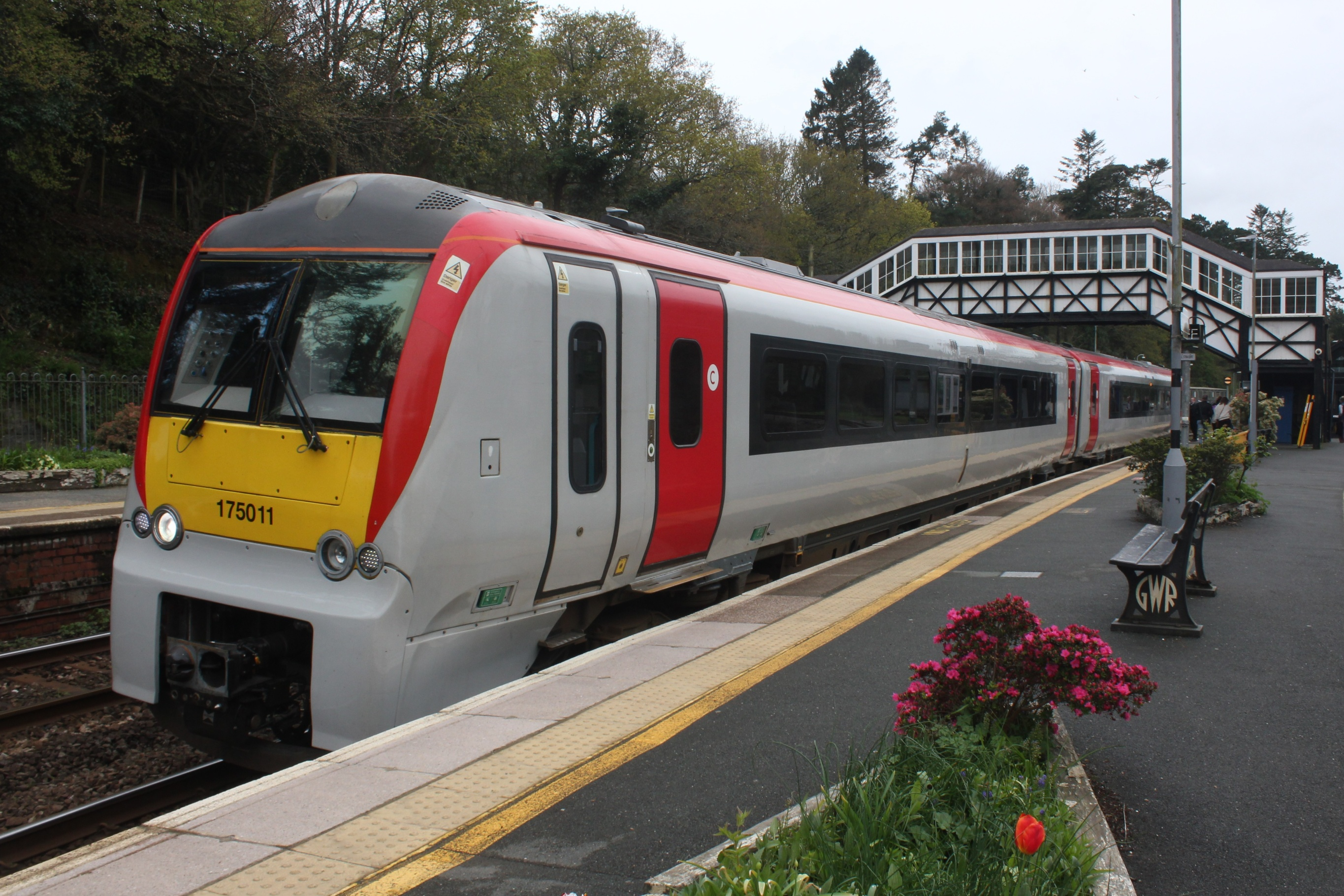
Class 175 at Bodmin Parkway

The Class 175 is the Alstom 'Coradia 1000' diesel-hydraulic multiple unit which was operated by North Western Trains in 2000. They were acquired by Great Western Railway in 2024 to replace the remaining Class 255 Castle-class trains and to free other DMUs for use on other routes in the region. It was planned to operate them between Exeter St Davids, Plymouth and Penzance, also on routes from Exeter Central to Okehampton and Barnstaple.

175002 was the first Class 175 unit to transfer to GWR on 27 November 2024. They began public service with Great Western Railway on the Cornish Main Line on 15 December 2025. and from May 2026 were also allocated to services on the Atlantic Coast Line to Newquay. Poor availability resulted in a 'temporary timetable' being implemented on the Penzance–Exeter route from 7 September 2026. Up to six services in each direction were withdrawn to reduce the likelihood of short notice cancellations. At the time only 15 of the 26 units had been delivered to GWR.

=== Current fleet ===
Family	Class	Image	Type	Top speed		Qty.	Carriages	Routes	Year Built
Family	Class	Image	Type	mph	km/h	Qty.	Carriages	Routes	Year Built
Commuter, regional and branch line
Sprinter	150/2		DMU	75	120	20	2	Exmouth – Paignton; Exeter Central – Okehampton; Exeter Central – Barnstaple; Plymouth – Gunnislake; Liskeard – Looe; Par – Newquay; Truro – Falmouth Docks; St Erth – St Ives	1986–1987
Sprinter	158 Express Sprinter		DMU	90	145	13	2	Cardiff Central – Portsmouth Harbour; Cardiff Central – Penzance; Axminster - Barnstaple; Bristol Temple Meads – Weymouth	1989–1992
Sprinter	158 Express Sprinter		DMU	90	145	5	3	Cardiff Central – Portsmouth Harbour; Cardiff Central – Penzance; Axminster - Barnstaple; Bristol Temple Meads – Weymouth	1989–1992
Networker	165 Networker Turbo		DMU	90	145	20	2	Reading – Redhill or Gatwick Airport; Reading – Basingstoke; Reading or Didcot Parkway – Oxford or Banbury; Twyford – Henley-on-Thames; Maidenhead – Marlow; Slough – Windsor & Eton Central; West Ealing – Greenford; Bristol Temple Meads – Avonmouth or Severn Beach; Great Malvern – Bristol Temple Meads – Salisbury or Weymouth; Swindon – Gloucester or Weymouth; Cardiff Central – Portsmouth Harbour; Exmouth - Paignton; Newbury - Bedwyn	1992
Networker	165 Networker Turbo		DMU	90	145	16	3	Reading – Redhill or Gatwick Airport; Reading – Basingstoke; Reading or Didcot Parkway – Oxford or Banbury; Twyford – Henley-on-Thames; Maidenhead – Marlow; Slough – Windsor & Eton Central; West Ealing – Greenford; Bristol Temple Meads – Avonmouth or Severn Beach; Great Malvern – Bristol Temple Meads – Salisbury or Weymouth; Swindon – Gloucester or Weymouth; Cardiff Central – Portsmouth Harbour; Exmouth - Paignton; Newbury - Bedwyn	1992
Networker	166 Networker Turbo		DMU	90	145	21	3	Bristol Temple Meads – Avonmouth or Severn Beach; Bristol Parkway – Weston-super-Mare; Cardiff Central – Taunton; Swindon – Westbury; Great Malvern – Bristol Temple Meads – Southampton Central or Weymouth; Cardiff Central – Portsmouth Harbour; Barnstaple – Exeter Central; Exmouth - Paignton	1992–1993
Alstom Coradia	175 Coradia 1000		DMU	100	160	10	2	Penzance – Exeter St Davids; Par – Newquay	1999–2001
Alstom Coradia	175 Coradia 1000		DMU	100	160	16	3	Penzance – Exeter St Davids; Par – Newquay	1999–2001
Vivarail D-Train	230		BEMU	60	97	1	3	West Ealing – Greenford (Saturdays only)	1978–1981 (LU); 2015–2019 (Vivarail)
Vivarail D-Train	230		DEMU	60	97	3	2	(Note: Only the fast-charge BEMU above is operated in passenger service)	1978–1981 (LU); 2015–2019 (Vivarail)
Bombardier Electrostar	387		EMU	110	177	30	4	London Paddington or Reading – Didcot Parkway, Newbury, Bristol Parkway or Swindon; London Paddington – Cardiff Central	2016–2017
	Inter-City								
Hitachi AT300	800 IET		BMU	125	201	36	5	London Paddington: – Oxford, Bedwyn, Worcester Shrub Hill, Great Malvern, Hereford; – Cardiff Central, Swansea, Carmarthen; – Bristol Temple Meads, Weston-super-Mare, Cheltenham Spa; – Exeter St Davids, Paignton, Plymouth, Penzance	2014–2018
Hitachi AT300	800 IET		BMU	125	201	21	9	London Paddington: – Oxford, Bedwyn, Worcester Shrub Hill, Great Malvern, Hereford; – Cardiff Central, Swansea, Carmarthen; – Bristol Temple Meads, Weston-super-Mare, Cheltenham Spa; – Exeter St Davids, Paignton, Plymouth, Penzance	2014–2018
Hitachi AT300	802 IET		BMU	125	201	22	5	London Paddington: – Exeter St Davids, Paignton, Plymouth, Penzance; – Oxford, Bedwyn, Worcester Shrub Hill, Great Malvern, Hereford	2017–2018
Hitachi AT300	802 IET		BMU	125	201	14	9	London Paddington: – Exeter St Davids, Paignton, Plymouth, Penzance; – Oxford, Bedwyn, Worcester Shrub Hill, Great Malvern, Hereford	2017–2018
Sleeper									
Night Riviera	57		Diesel locomotive	95	152	5	Varies (Note: Locomotive-hauled Mark 3 coaches are generally formed of 7–9 coaches for the Night Riviera. They are hauled by a single Class 57.)	2 Night Riviera sets for London Paddington – Penzance sleeper service	1964–1967 (Rebuild: 1998–2004)
Night Riviera	Mark 3		Passenger coach	110	177	20	Varies	2 Night Riviera sets for London Paddington – Penzance sleeper service	1975–1988
Shunting locomotives									
	08		Shunting locomotive	15	24	8	n/a	Stock movements in depots	1952–1962

=== Past fleet ===
Family	Class	Image	Type	Top speed		Total	Withdrawn	Notes
Family	Class	Image	Type	mph	km/h	Total	Withdrawn	Notes
Commuter, regional and branch line
Pacer	142		DMU	75	120	12	2011	Replaced by Class 165 Networker Turbo and Class 166 Networker Turbo
Pacer	143		DMU	75	120	8	2020	Replaced by Class 165 Networker Turbo and Class 166 Networker Turbo
Sprinter	150/0		DMU	75	120	2	2020	Replaced by Class 165 Networker Turbo and Class 166 Networker Turbo; Transferred to Arriva Rail North and Northern Trains
Sprinter	150/1		DMU	75	120	17	2018	Replaced by Class 165 Networker Turbo and Class 166 Networker Turbo; Transferred to Arriva Rail North and Northern Trains
Sprinter	153 Super Sprinter		DMU	75	120	14	2018–2019	Replaced by Class 165 Networker Turbo and Class 166 Networker Turbo; Transferred to Abellio ScotRail and KeolisAmey Wales
Bombardier Electrostar	387/1		EMU	110	177	15	2019–2020, 2023	12 units transferred to Heathrow Express between 2019–2020; 3 units transferred to Great Northern in 2023
Bombardier Electrostar	387/2		EMU	110	177	6	2021–22	These trains were subleased from Great Northern in 2021, to provide cover for Class 800 and Class 802 InterCity Express Train (IET) units, following cracks being found on the IETs; After the issues surrounding the IET trains were resolved, these units were returned to Great Northern at the end of 2021
Bombardier Electrostar	387/3		EMU	110	177	3	2021–22	These trains were transferred from c2c to provide cover for Class 800 and Class 802 InterCity Express Train (IET) units, following cracks being found on the IETs; In June 2022 the units were withdrawn and transferred to Great Northern in July 2022
Class 255 Castle	43 HST		Diesel locomotive	125	201	11 (in 2024)	2025	These 'InterCity 125' trains operated InterCity services in the region from 1976 (see Inter-City below) but were later reduced in length and confined to services between Cardiff Central, Plymouth and Penzance. In this form they were referred to as Class 255. The few remaining trains were withdrawn on 13 December 2025 by which time they had been further reduced to just services between Exeter, Plymouth and Penzance.
Class 255 Castle	Mark 3		Passenger coach	125	201	22	2025	These 'InterCity 125' trains operated InterCity services in the region from 1976 (see Inter-City below) but were later reduced in length and confined to services between Cardiff Central, Plymouth and Penzance. In this form they were referred to as Class 255. The few remaining trains were withdrawn on 13 December 2025 by which time they had been further reduced to just services between Exeter, Plymouth and Penzance.
Inter-City
InterCity 125	43 (HST)		Diesel locomotive	125	200	91	2019	Replaced by Class 800 IET and Class 802 IET; Transfer of some power cars and coaches to Abellio ScotRail
InterCity 125	Mark 3		Passenger coach	125	200	408	2019	Replaced by Class 800 IET and Class 802 IET; Transfer of some power cars and coaches to Abellio ScotRail
Alstom Coradia	180 Adelante		DMU	125	200	14	2017	Replaced by Class 800 IET and Class 802 IET; Transferred to Grand Central

Locomotive-hauled trains were in use on services between Cardiff, Bristol, Taunton and Paignton from December 2008 until November 2010 using Virgin Trains Class 57 locomotives with Mark 2 coaching stock. A second set hauled by EWS Class 67s was used between December 2009 and October 2010. These were withdrawn when sufficient DMUs were available following the transfer of six Class 150/1 sets from London Overground. First Great Western issued a tender in May 2013 so that locomotive-hauled trains, or other train formations, could be operated on the Taunton-Cardiff route again, proposed to start in December 2013, to cover for DMUs out of service for refurbishment on Monday-to-Friday diagrams. GWR also runs loco-hauled sets composed of seating coaches and a Class 57 locomotive from the Night Riviera service between Penzance and Exeter St Davids as part of the summer timetable to release a DMU for other services.

Twelve Class 142 Pacer DMUs were received by First Great Western in 2007, starting operations that December. These were sub-leased from Northern Rail (where they had been stored), in part to cover for refurbishment of FGW's Sprinter fleets but also to allow the Class 158s to be re-formed as three-coach sets. They were based at Exeter TMD, working alongside the similar Class 143s on services in Devon and Cornwall, including the Avocet Line, Riviera Line and Tarka Line. Five 142s were returned to Northern Rail in late 2008, following the completion of the refresh of Class 150 Sprinter units. The remaining seven units were returned to Northern Rail by November 2011 as they had been replaced by Class 150 units cascaded from London Overground and London Midland following the arrival of new Class 172 Turbostar units.

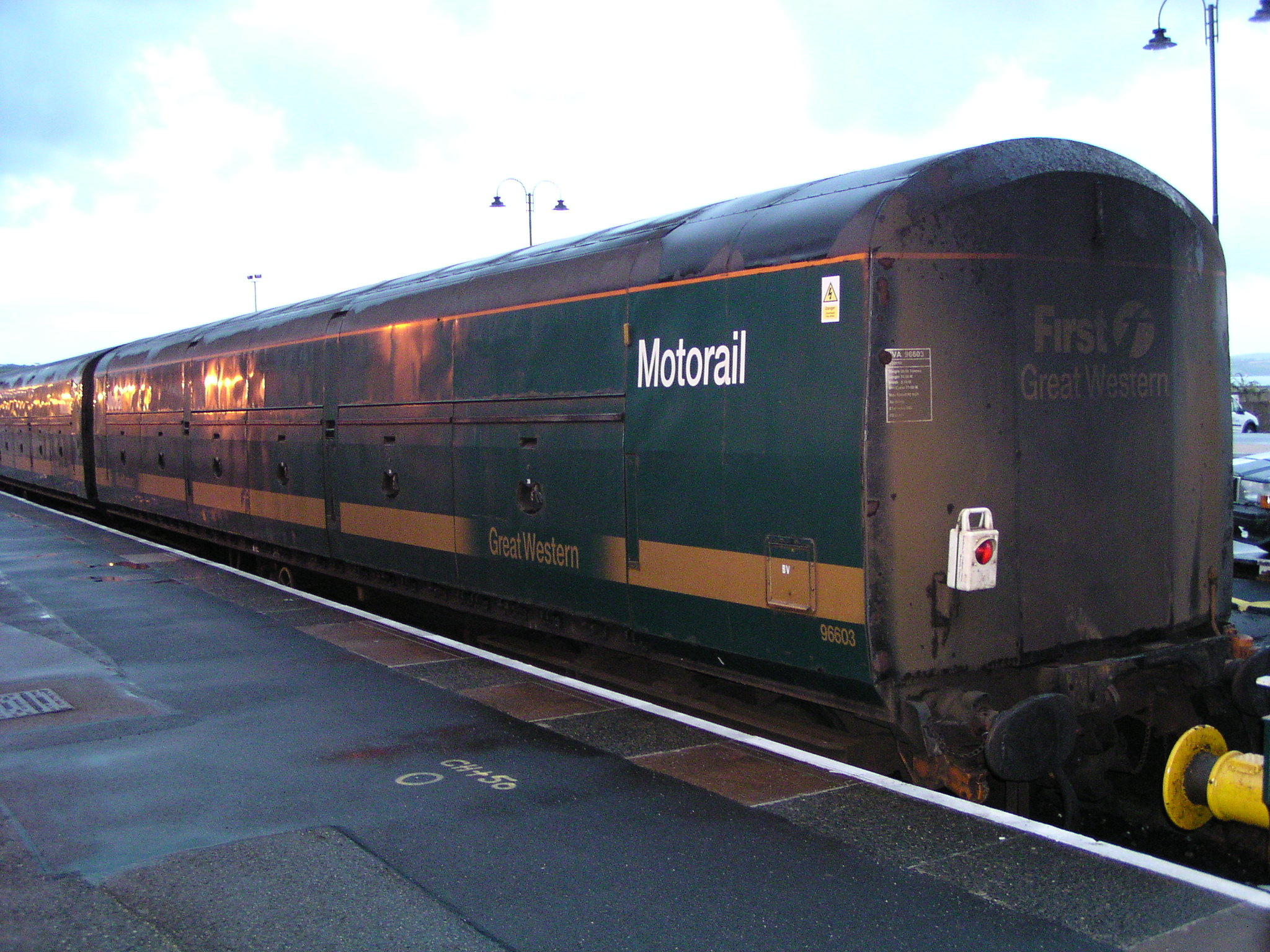
A former FGW motorail carriage, seen at Penzance

GWR's Night Riviera service also included the UK's last Motorail service, until that was withdrawn at the end of the 2005 summer season due to low usage.

First Great Western previously leased 14 Class 180 Adelante units, operating on the Great Western Main Line, but following technical issues they were transferred elsewhere. In 2012, five units were returned to First Great Western to operate weekday services on the Cotswold Line, allowing class 165 and 166 units to be reallocated to increase capacity on Thames Valley services. The Class 180s left GWR in stages between June and December 2017 to join Grand Central.

The 150/1s in the GWR fleet transferred to Arriva Rail North in stages, beginning with the first three in August 2017 when their leases expired, and ending in April 2018. The 153s also transferred elsewhere in stages too, with the first four units going to East Midlands Trains and the next five units going to Arriva Rail North. This left just five 153 units with GWR, which eventually transferred to Transport for Wales in April 2019.

Great Western Railway retained 24 power cars and 48 carriages from its former High Speed Train fleet to form 12 'Castle' 2+4 sets. They were branded as Class 255 sets and were used on multiple services between Plymouth and Penzance. All the sets were withdrawn at the end of 2025, ending their services with GWR in Devon and Cornwall and are planned to be replaced with Class 175s. All power cars retained had new nameplates, named after castles from across the area that GWR serve. The sets are progressively being fitted with automatic doors and controlled emission toilets, to allow their operation beyond 2020, at Doncaster Works. Due to a delay in refurbishing the Castle sets, slam door 2+4 sets known as 'Classic' sets were used until the end of 2019. Until 2017, GWR operated the vast majority of its long-distance services with a fleet of 58 InterCity 125 High Speed Train sets, each consisting of eight Mark 3 coaches sandwiched between two Class 43 locomotives. GWR operated the largest InterCity 125 fleet, owning five sets outright; the rest were leased from Angel Trains and Porterbrook. From 2009 to 2012 (when Class 180s were reintroduced on the Cotswold line) all the company's intercity services were worked by HSTs except the Night Riviera sleeper service between London Paddington and Penzance. From late 2017, following the completion of electrification from Hayes & Harlington to the west of England, intercity services gradually became operated by Class 800 IETs, although a few peak services remained operated by HSTs until early 2019. GWR continued to use HSTs on services to Exeter, Plymouth and Penzance until May 2019, when they were all withdrawn in favour of Class 802 units. The youngest Class 43 locomotive dated from 1982. After a successful trial by Angel Trains and FGW in 2004, two power cars received new MTU engines while two received new Paxman VP185s, fitted by Brush Traction of Loughborough. The MTU engine proved the better option, both for reliability and for emissions, resulting in FGW, Brush and Angel Trains starting the HST Modernisation programme. The last power cars to be re-engineered were released in April 2008, while several other companies' HSTs have undergone a similar programme. GWR's High Speed Train fleet were refurbished by Bombardier in Derby and Ilford between 2006 and 2008, with leather seats introduced in first class, redesigned toilets, a redesigned buffet, and at-seat power points. The company opted for mainly airline seats, giving more seats per train. Following the Southall and Ladbroke Grove rail crashes, GWR required its HSTs to have automatic train protection and Automatic Warning System safety systems in operation. If either was faulty, the train was not used.

=== Rejected fleet ===
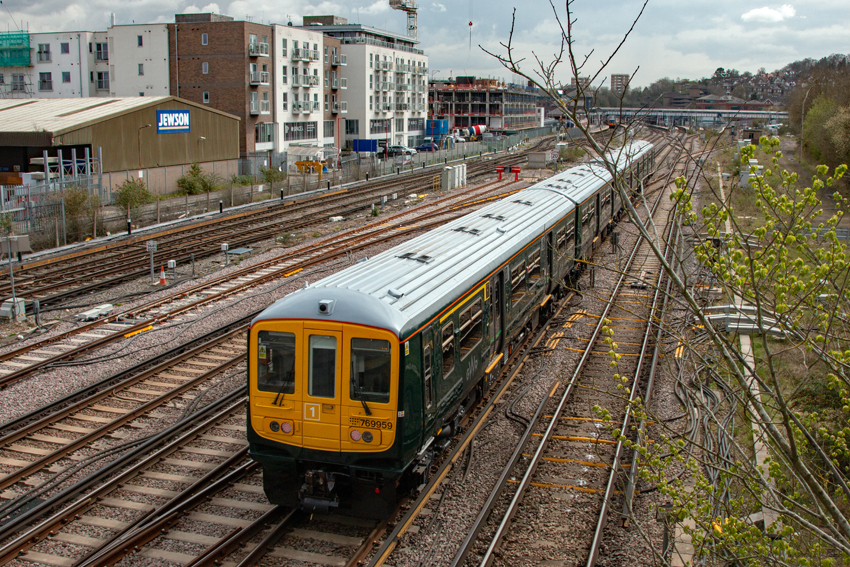
Class 769 on a trial run at Guildford

It was planned for Great Western Railway to operate nineteen Class 769/9 units once they were fully rolled out. The operator intended to run the first services in spring 2019, but this was delayed by issues faced by Porterbrook in converting the units. However, the first vehicle has been delivered and all were expected to be delivered by the end of 2021.

Although initially planned for use in London and the Thames Valley, while 12 Class 387 units were modified for Heathrow Express services, the future plan for these units was to be operating on services between Oxford, Reading and Gatwick Airport, which would have meant operating on non-electrified lines, 25 kV AC OHLE and 750 V DC third-rail routes. To enable this, GWR's allocation of Class 769 units retained their dual-voltage capability in addition to being fitted with diesel power units. The units also received an internal refurbishment and be fitted with air cooling.

The first Class 769 to be delivered to GWR was unit 769943, which arrived at Reading TMD in August 2020. It was expected to enter service in early 2021. The Class 769 was expected to enter squadron service with GWR between June and December 2021, but this was later delayed to 2022.

In December 2022, GWR announced that the introduction of the Class 769 fleet would be abandoned and the units handed back to Porterbrook in April 2023. This was to comply with DfT mandated cost-cutting and also as a result of dissatisfaction with the reliability of the units on test.

== Livery ==
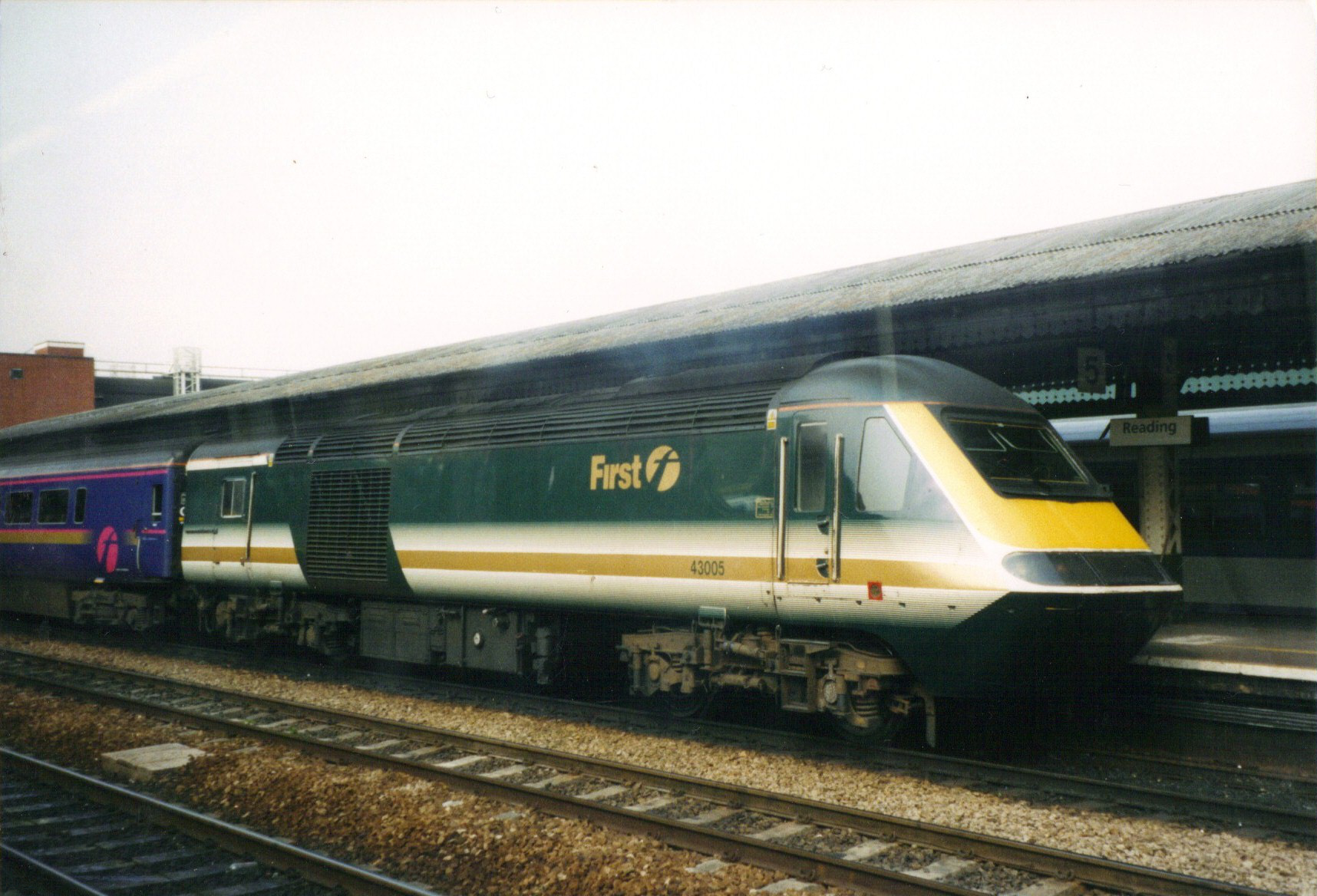
HST in modified Great Western Trains livery with First Group logo and fader vinyls at Reading

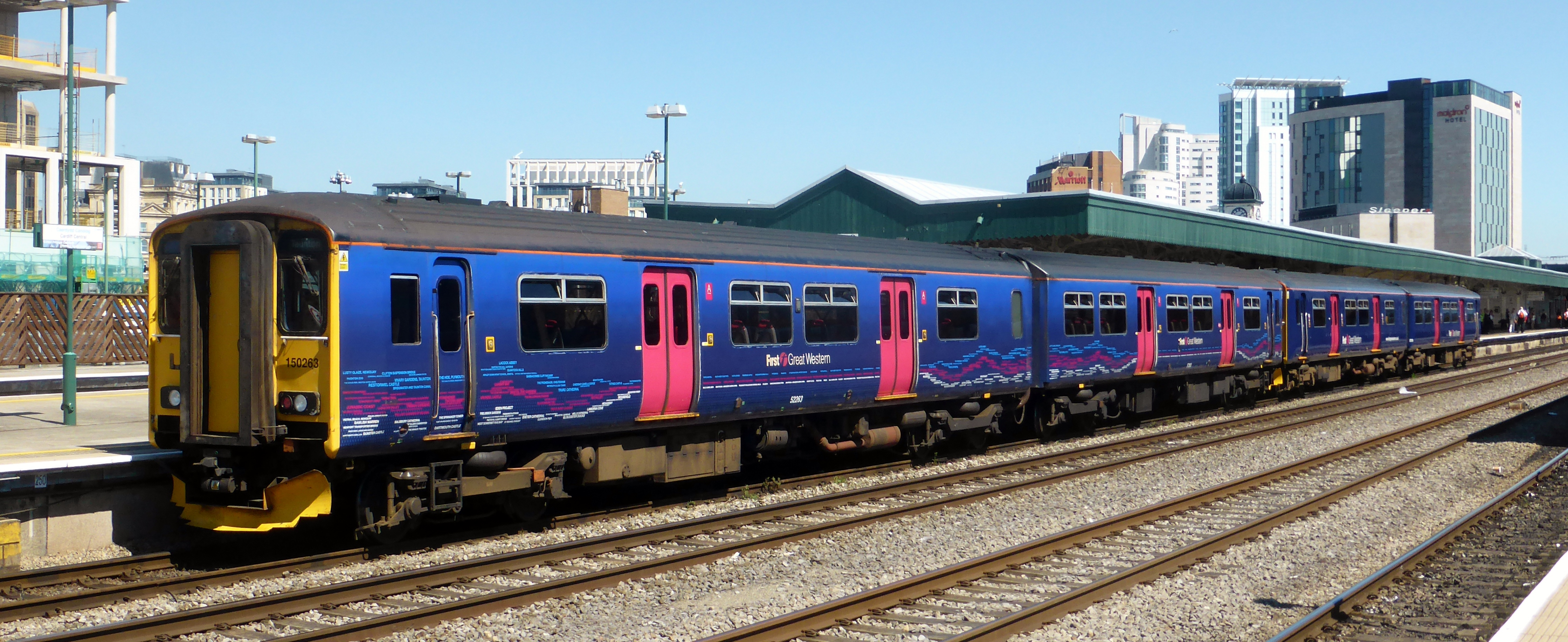
A First Great Western Class 150 in the 'Local Lines' livery, worn by former Wessex Trains services

Great Western Trains adopted a livery of dark-green upper body and ivory lower body, with a stylised 'Merlin' bird logo. Following the rebranding as First Great Western, fader vinyls were added to the lower body, with a gold bar containing the stylised FirstGroup F logo and separate Great Western logotype. This livery was sometimes known as the 'fag packet' livery.

When the Class 180 Adelante units were delivered, they were painted in the intercity version of FirstGroup's corporate bus livery. This consisted of a purple-blue base, with pink and gold bars and large pink Fs on the carriage sides and white highlights along the roof and around the driver's cab. The doors were painted white to comply with the Disability Discrimination Act 1995. The HST fleet was repainted to match as they went through overhaul; however, the livery on the power cars was progressively altered to a plain blue base with pink and gold stripes, following problems with dirt build-up on the large white areas.

The new Greater Western franchise involved repainting the HST fleet into FirstGroup's 'Dynamic Lines' livery for intercity and commuter services in the former First Great Western and First Great Western Link areas. The livery was initially applied to the HST fleet as they went through refurbishment, although the Class 180 units did not receive the new livery due to the termination of their lease. The commuter units also received the new livery while receiving standard maintenance, as a refurbishment was not originally planned. The rebranding of the company as Great Western Railway introduced a new GWR logo and a dark green livery with white stripes and grey doors in September 2015.

== Depots ==
Great Western Railway trains are based at eight depots. Other depots at Landore (Swansea) and Old Oak Common (London) closed in 2018.

Depot	Nearest station	Allocation	Picture	Notes
North Pole	London Paddington	800; 802		Operated by Agility Trains
Reading	Reading	165; 166; 230; 387; Mark 3 Coach; 57		Rebuilt to the North of its original location for the new flyover.
Stoke Gifford	Bristol Parkway	800, 802		Operated by Agility Trains
St Phillip's Marsh	Bristol Temple Meads	08; 43; 150; 158; 165; 166		
Exeter TMD	Exeter St Davids	150; 158		
Laira	Plymouth	08; 43; 150; 802		
Long Rock	Penzance	08; 43; 150; 57; Mark 3 Coach		
Swansea Maliphant	Swansea	800		Operated by Agility Trains

=== Former depots ===
Depot	Nearest station	Allocation	Picture	Notes
Old Oak Common Depot	London Paddington	08; 43; 57		Closed 8 December 2018
Landore TMD	Swansea	08; 43		Closed for GWR in 2018

== See also ==
- Western Region of British Railways, the nationalised division of British Rail from 1948 to 1992

Preceded by InterCity; As part of British Rail	Operator of Great Western franchise 1996–2006	Succeeded by First Great Western; Greater Western franchise
Preceded by First Great Western; Great Western franchise	Operator of Greater Western franchise 2006–2028	Incumbent
Preceded by First Great Western Link; Thames franchise	Operator of Greater Western franchise 2006–2028	Incumbent
Preceded by Wessex Trains; Wessex franchise	Operator of Greater Western franchise 2006–2028	Incumbent
