= KEU =

KEU or Keu can refer to:

- Sir Kay, the legendary brother of King Arthur, called Keu in French
- Kebu language, a language spoken in Togo and Ghana, by ISO 639 code
- Keekorok Airport, an airport in Masai Mara, Kenya, by IATA code

== See also ==
- Coo (disambiguation)
- Koo (disambiguation)
- Coup, or a military seizing of power
- Coup (disambiguation)
- CU (disambiguation)
- KU (disambiguation)
- Q (disambiguation)
