= Marlow branch line =

Railway line in South East England

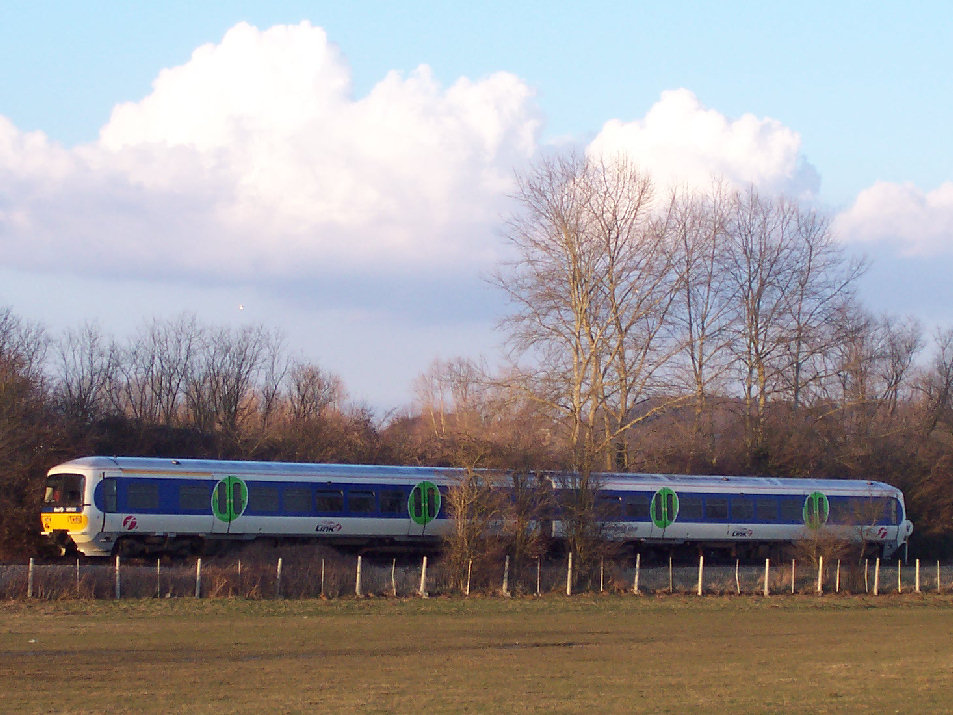
- A First Great Western Class 165 DMU running between Bourne End and Marlow in 2006. This service is known locally as "The Marlow Donkey".

Overview
- Status: Operational
- Owner: Network Rail
- Locale: Buckinghamshire, Berkshire; South East England
- Termini: Maidenhead; Marlow
- Stations: 5

Service
- Type: Heavy rail
- System: National Rail
- Operator: Great Western Railway
- Rolling stock: Class 165 "Turbo"; Class 166 "Turbo Express"

History
- Opened: 1854

Technical
- Track length: 7 miles 10 chains (11.5 km)
- Num of tracks: Single track
- Character: Branch line
- Track gauge: 4 ft 8 1/2 in (1,435 mm) standard gauge
- Old gauge: 7 ft (2,134 mm)
- Operating speed: 50 mph (80 km/h)
Route map
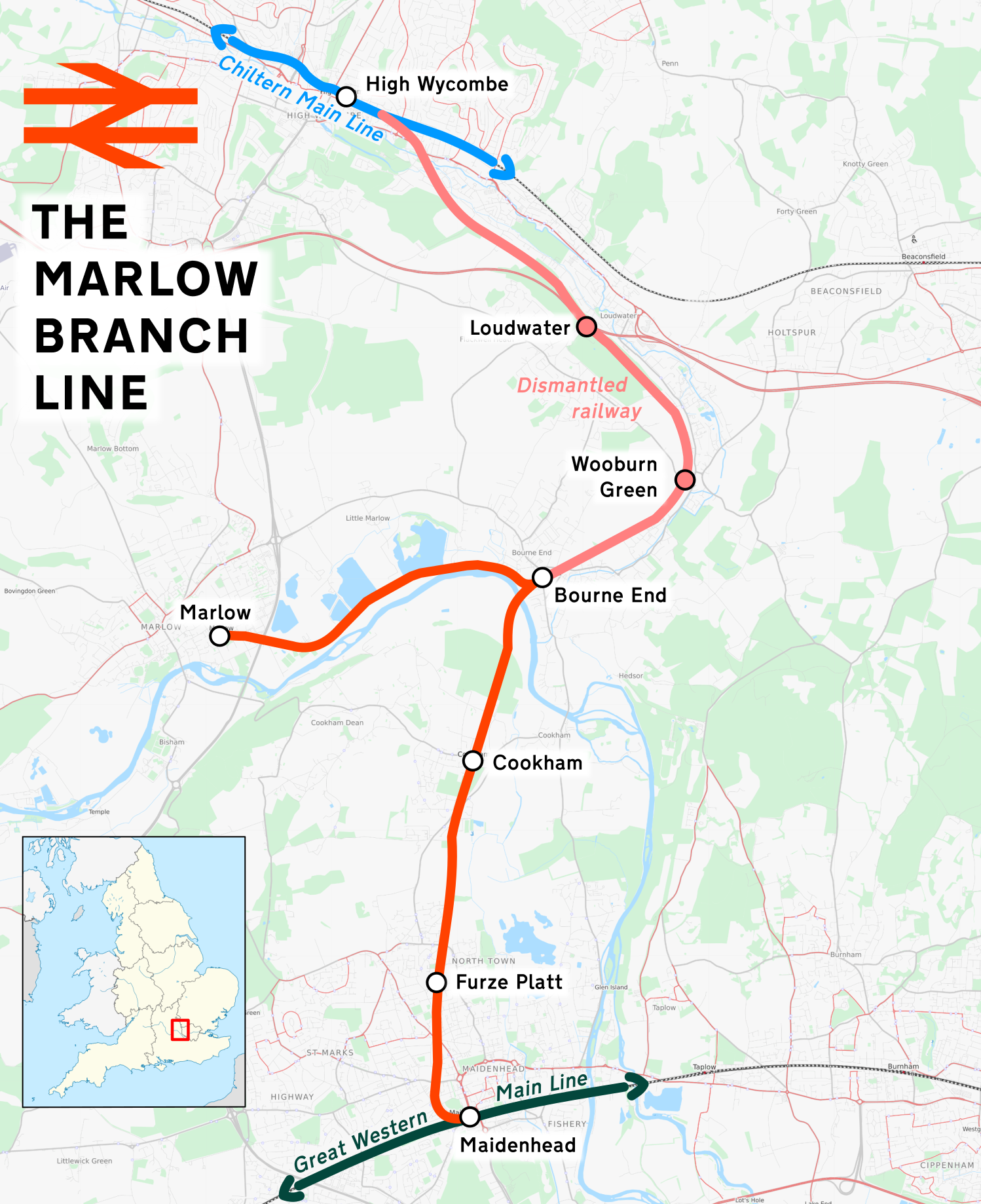
(Click to expand)

The Marlow branch line is a single track railway line in England, between Maidenhead station in Berkshire and Bourne End and Marlow stations in Buckinghamshire. It is 7 miles 10 chains (11.5 km) in length. Passenger services are operated by Great Western Railway using Class 165 and Class 166 diesel trains. The line connects to the Great Western Main Line at Maidenhead; it uses a section of the former Wycombe Railway line to High Wycombe together with the former Great Marlow Railway.

The train that runs on the branch line is known as The Marlow Donkey although the exact derivation of the term is unclear. Karau and Turner say "the trains of pack horses, mules and donkeys carrying goods to the riverside prompted the local people to christen the train on the Great Marlow Railway, the 'Marlow Donkey', a name which survives to this day". However, Anthony Wethered, great-grandson of the first chairman of the company, suggests that it is the name of the line. A third tradition identifies a particular locomotive. A pub in Marlow is named after it.

== Train services ==
The off-peak service is one train per hour in each direction between Maidenhead and Marlow. During morning and evening peak times a two trains per hour service is achieved by using two trains: one shuttling between Marlow and Bourne End, and another between Bourne End and Maidenhead. This is possible because Bourne End station has two platforms that may be used simultaneously.

All trains from Marlow must stop and reverse at Bourne End, as the line to Marlow has a trailing connection, and the driver must change ends for the second part of the route. As a result of the position at which the Marlow branch enters Bourne End station, the length of trains serving Marlow is limited to two coaches of class 165 rolling stock. Most off-peak trains on the line begin at Marlow and terminate at Maidenhead.

The following settlements are served by the branch line:

- Maidenhead
- Furze Platt
- Cookham
- Bourne End
- Marlow

== History ==
=== Construction ===
In July 1846, the Wycombe Railway Company was incorporated by the Wycombe Railway Act 1846 (9 & 10 Vict. c. ccxxxvi). The act authorised the construction of a single line from the original Great Western Railway (GWR) station at Maidenhead, to High Wycombe. Construction began in 1852, and the completed line to High Wycombe, was finally opened on 1 August 1854.

The line left the GWR main line at the site of the present Maidenhead station, the first stop of which was Maidenhead (Wycombe Junction), renamed in the 1860s, Boyne Hill. This station was closed on 1 November 1871 upon the opening of the present Maidenhead station. The Wycombe Railway Company was taken over by the GWR on 1 February 1867.

Great Marlow Railway Act 1868
- Act of Parliament
- Parliament of the United Kingdom
- Long title: An Act for making a Railway from the Wycombe Branch of the Great Western Railway to Great Marlow in the County of Buckingham; and for other Purposes.
- Citation: 31 & 32 Vict. c. c

Dates
- Royal assent: 13 July 1868

Text of statute as originally enacted

In August 1867 the business men of Great Marlow met to discuss a connection with the GWR Wycombe branch line, at the station then called Marlow Road (now Bourne End). The Great Marlow Railway Act 1868 (31 & 32 Vict. c. c) was given royal assent on 13 July 1868 with an authorised capital of £18,000. Only about one third of this was raised locally and the GWR supplied the remainder. The 2.75 miles (4.43 km) line opened on 27 June 1873, and Marlow Road was renamed Bourne End in 1874 to avoid confusion.

The Marlow company maintained the line and supplied the station staff, whilst the GWR supplied and operated the rolling stock. The no. 522, GWR 517 Class 0-4-2 saddle tank locomotive (built at Wolverhampton in 1868), was affectionately known as the Marlow Donkey. No. 522 was rebuilt at Swindon Works in 1884 and similar Metro 2-4-0 class locomotives remained in service until 1935 when autotrains were introduced.

Under the Great Western Railway (Additional Powers) Act 1897 (60 & 61 Vict. c. ccxlviii) the GWR acquired the remainder of the capital and ownership of the line, thereby relieving the Marlow owners of the responsibility for ongoing maintenance of the line.

The maximum number of stops on the line were:

- Maidenhead (latterly renamed Maidenhead Boyne Hill and effectively replaced by the current Maidenhead station),
- Cookham,
- Marlow Road (latterly renamed Bourne End),
- Wooburn Green,
- Loudwater,
- High Wycombe.

In 1937 Furze Platt station was added on the outskirts of Maidenhead (before Cookham station).

=== Partial closure ===
Part of the original reason for the line, connecting High Wycombe to London, was removed by the opening in 1906 of the Great Western and Great Central Joint Railway which provided direct connections from High Wycombe via Gerrards Cross to London Paddington and the then-new London Marylebone. The Marylebone route, with minor alterations, forms the present-day Chiltern Main Line. The newer line took most of the traffic between High Wycombe and London away from the Bourne End route. In July 1962 the steam locomotive was replaced with a Diesel multiple unit. The service was gradually cut back through to 1969, by which time Marlow station had been demolished and replaced by a smaller one on the site of the former goods yard. Loudwater and Wooburn Green lost their ticket offices, Loudwater had been reduced to a single track halt and Cookham lost its passing loop.

Finally, on 2 May 1970 the stretch of line from Bourne End to High Wycombe was closed to passengers after the Minister of Transport at the time refused to grant the British Railways Board £60,000 to keep the line open from Bourne End to High Wycombe. As a result of this, the intermediate stations at Wooburn Green and Loudwater had no services and closed.

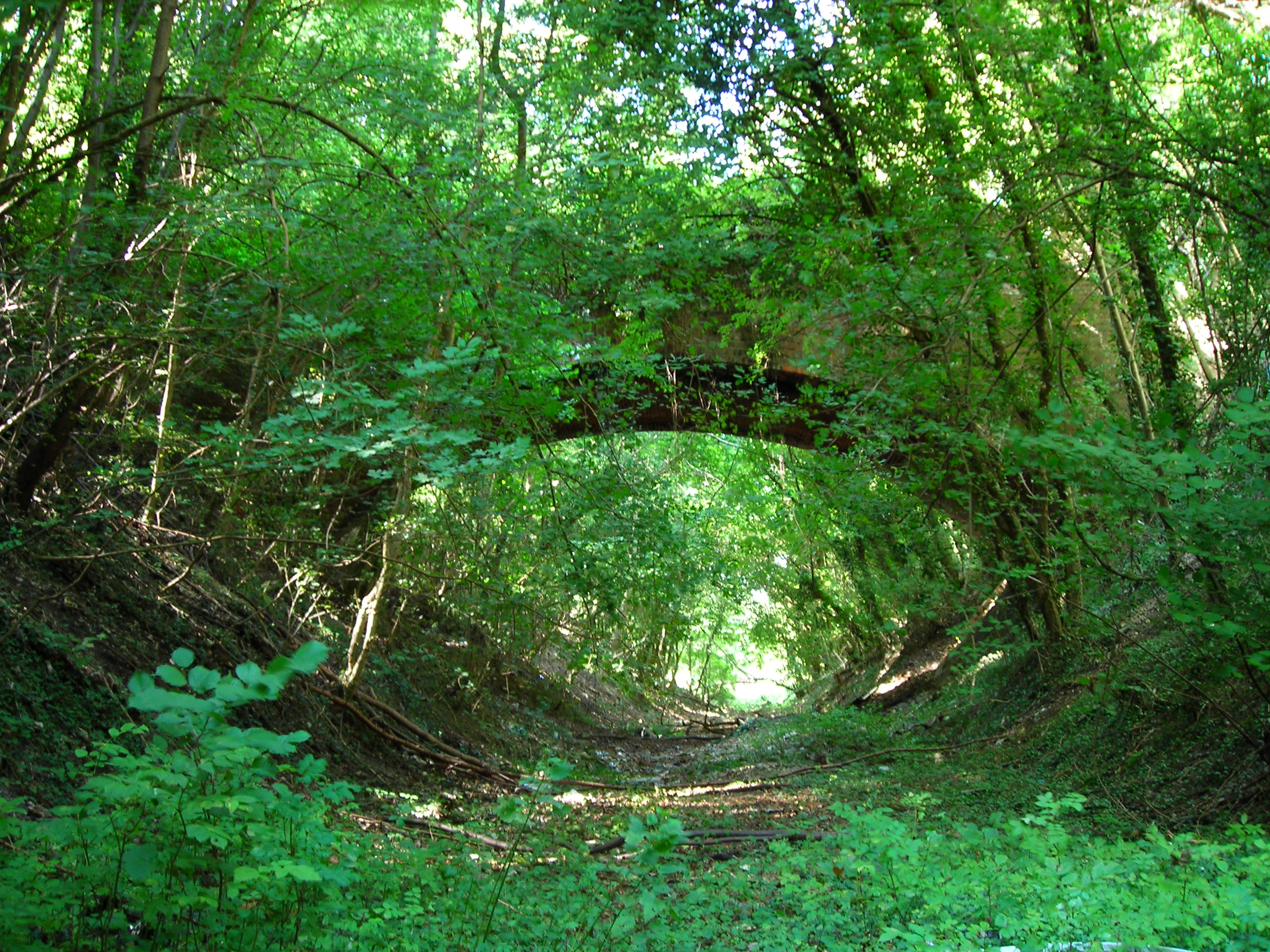
Abbey Barn Lane Bridge

During the 1970s and 1980s, much of the land occupied by the old line was sold off and a number of buildings were built on the path of the old railway. Five of its seven bridges were demolished, namely: Gordon Road; the access to the former E Gomme (G Plan furniture) factory where the track is now a road into a housing estate which replaced the factory; the A40 at Spring Gardens; Bassetsbury Lane; and Spring Lane. The bridge over Bowden Lane (now a footpath at this point) remains, and at the bottom of Abbey Barn Lane the bridge continues to carry the road over the site of the old line. To prevent future incursion, the path of the line through Bourne End, Wooburn Green, Loudwater and the Wycombe Marsh area of Wycombe is listed in the local plan, as set aside as a footpath/cycle route or bus route. Loudwater Station and goods yard, together with Bourne End coal yard siding, are now industrial and office units.

=== Future ===
The High Wycombe Society, a local conservation group, has campaigned for the reinstatement of the line as light rail, the feasibility of which was confirmed by an engineering survey of the route. In September 2008, Buckinghamshire County Council backed the proposal for reinstatement and called upon a private operator to finance the rebuilding work. The future of the route was raised at a planning hearing later that year, at which Wycombe District Council identified the prospect of reinstatement as a reason for refusing a planning application to construct housing over the trackbed at Wycombe Lane, Wooburn Green. A previous application for the same development was rejected in 2006 and the Council's decision was upheld on appeal to the planning inspector. In January 2009, a second attempt to build on the route of the railway line was rejected by the Planning Inspectorate which specifically cited the possible future reinstatement of the line as a reason for refusing consent.

From 2009, the Windsor Link Railway proposed re-opening this line for heavy rail. They claim that this, combined with the new link from Slough to Waterloo, would have a positive business case and greatly facility orbital rail connections west of London. However, these plans were rejected by the Department for Transport in 2018.

=== Electrification ===
The remainder of the line was confirmed for electrification in the Government's railway High Level Output Specification for Control Period 5 (April 2014 – March 2019). In January 2016, electrification of the branch was ruled out following delays to the core 21st-century modernisation of the Great Western Main Line.

== Route description ==
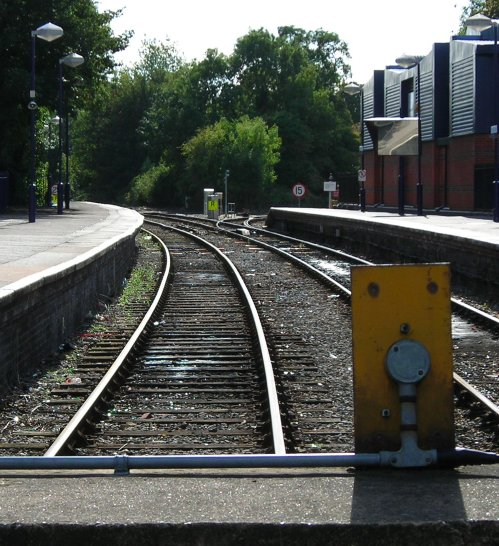
Bourne End railway station, where the driver changes ends

From splitting with the Great Western Main Line at Maidenhead station, it turns north and enters a cutting, going under Grenfell Road and the A4 Castle Hill, passing over the A308 Marlow Road and then a level crossing on Harrow Lane just before its next stop, Furze Platt. From Furze Platt it passes under B4447 Gardner Road, alongside the old Maidenhead Road as it exits the town, continuing through countryside briefly before crossing over the B4447 again before the second stop, Cookham. Immediately after leaving Cookham there is a level crossing on Station Hill, a slight cutting passing under Terry's Lane, up on a viaduct over Cockmarsh before crossing the Thames and arriving shortly after at Bourne End. Here the driver changes ends for Marlow, turning back along the north bank of the Thames by Spade Oak, passing south of the water treatment works, under the A404 Marlow bypass and finally Marlow station, where the line terminates.

== See also ==
- Great Western Main Line
- Great Western Railway
- First Great Western Link
- List of closed railway stations in Britain
- Wycombe Railway
