= Furze Platt railway station =

Railway station in the town of Maidenhead, Berkshire, England

Furze Platt
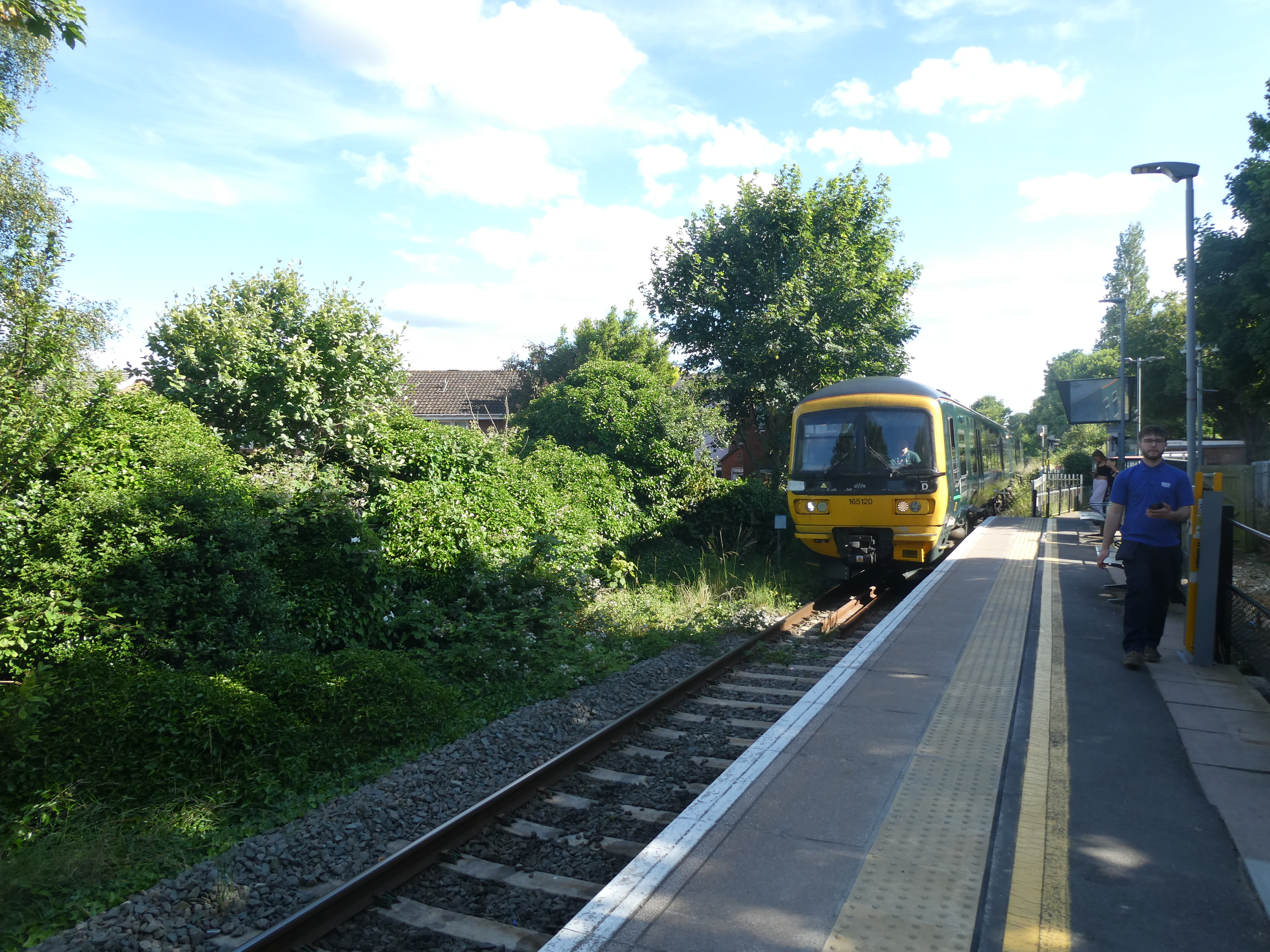
- Looking up towards Maidenhead while a GWR class 165 is crossing level crossing

General information
- Location: Maidenhead, Windsor and Maidenhead; England
- Coordinates: 51°31′59.48″N 0°43′43.14″W
- Grid reference: SU882823
- Managed by: Great Western Railway
- Platforms: 1

Other information
- Station code: FZP
- Classification: DfT category E

History
- Original company: Great Western Railway
- Post-grouping: GWR

Key dates
- 5 July 1937: Opened as "Furze Platt Halt"
- 5 May 1969: Renamed "Furze Platt"

Passengers
- 2020/21: ▼39,580
- 2021/22: ▲98,582
- 2022/23: ▲0.117 million
- 2023/24: ▲0.153 million
- 2024/25: ▲0.178 million
Location
Notes
- Passenger statistics from the Office of Rail and Road

Furze Platt railway station is a railway station in the town of Maidenhead, Berkshire, England. It is 1 mile 22 chains (2.1 km) down the line from Maidenhead station and 25 miles 41 chains (41.1 km) measured from London Paddington.

== History ==
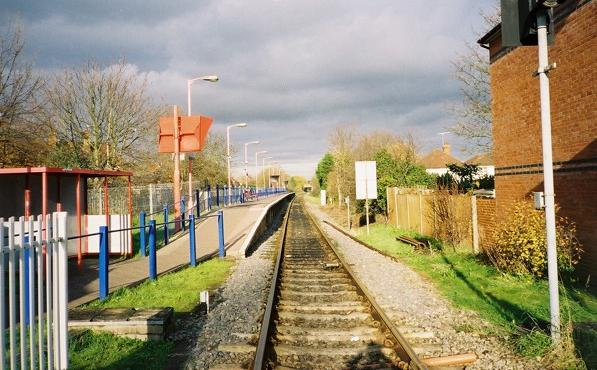
View North Towards Cookham

The Wycombe Railway (WR), part of which now forms the greater portion of the Marlow branch line, opened between Maidenhead and High Wycombe in 1854 with the first station out of Maidenhead being Cookham.

The Great Western Railway absorbed the Wycombe Railway in 1867 and opened "Furze Platt Halt" on 5 July 1937 to serve the area's growing population. British Rail renamed the station "Furze Platt" on 5 May 1969.

The single platform station has basic facilities including a waiting shelter, a customer help point, and a ticket office is open weekdays from 6:45 to 11:30. The station is next to a level crossing on Harrow Lane, Maidenhead.

== Services ==
All services at Furze Platt are operated by Great Western Railway.

The typical off-peak service is one train per hour between Maidenhead and Marlow. During the peak hours, the service is increased to two trains per hour in each direction and northbound trains runs to and from Bourne End only, connecting with a half-hourly shuttle service between Bourne End and Marlow.

Preceding station	National Rail	Following station
Maidenhead	Great Western Railway Marlow Branch Line	Cookham
