= Ku =

Ku, KU, or Kū may refer to:

== Arts and entertainment ==
- Ku (fictional language), a constructed language created for the 2005 film The Interpreter
- In an alien language in the movie Kin-dza-dza!, "ku" replaces most conventional words, with its meaning guessed from context
- In the Discworld, Ku or The Lost Continent of Ku is a satirical parody of Atlantis

== Businesses and organizations ==
=== Political ===
- Kommunistisk Ungdom (Communist Youth), the former name of the Young Left (Sweden)
- Young Conservatives (Denmark) (Konservativ Ungdom), the Young Conservatives (Denmark)
- Konstitutionsutskottet, the Committee on the Constitution (Parliament of Sweden)
- Ku Klux Klan, a white supremacy group in the US

=== Universities ===
==== Africa ====
- Kampala University in Kampala, Uganda
- Kismayo University in Kismayo, Somalia

==== Japan ====
- Kyoto University, a national research university
- Kyushu University, a national research university
- Kobe University, a national university
- Kanagawa University, a national university
- Kagoshima University, a national university
- Kagawa University, a national university
- Kumamoto University, a national university
- Kochi University, a national university
- Korea University (Japan), a private university

==== Asia ====
- Kabul University in Kabul, Afghanistan
- Kakatiya University in India
- Kandahar University in Kandahar, Afghanistan
- Karunya University in Tamil Nadu, India
- Kathmandu University in Dhulikhel, Nepal
- Khulna University in Khulna, Bangladesh
- Kuvempu University in Karnataka, India
- Konkuk University in South Korea
- Korea University in South Korea
- Karachi University in Pakistan
- Kasetsart University in Thailand
- Kuwait University in Kuwait
- Kashmir University in Kashmir, India.

==== Europe ====
- Catholic University of Eichstätt-Ingolstadt (Katholische Universität) in Eichstätt and Ingolstadt, Germany
- Catholic University in Ružomberok (Katolícka univerzita) in Ružomberok, Slovakia
- Klaipėda University in Klaipėda, Lithuania
- KU Leuven in Belgium
- University of Copenhagen (Københavns Universitet) in Copenhagen, Denmark

==== United States ====
- Kean University in Union Township, New Jersey
- Keiser University, main campus and headquarters in Fort Lauderdale, Florida
- Kettering University in Flint, Michigan
- Kutztown University of Pennsylvania in Kutztown, Pennsylvania
- University of Kansas in Lawrence, Kansas or its athletic program, the Kansas Jayhawks

=== Other businesses and organizations ===
- Kentucky Utilities, an American electric utility company based in Lexington, Kentucky
- Kuwait Airways (IATA code)

== Language ==
- Ku (kana), romanization of the Japanese kana く and ク
- Kurdish language (ISO 639 (alpha-2) code KU)
- Ku (fictional language), fictional language in the 2005 film The Interpreter

== People ==
=== Tribe ===
- Khonds, an aboriginal tribe of India

=== Individuals ===
- Emperor Ku of ancient China, of Three August Ones and Five Emperors
- Georgia Ku, English singer and songwriter
- Esther Ku, Korean-American comedian
- Michelle Embree Ku, American politician
- Shawn Ku, U.S. choreographer and motion picture director
- Kumi Koda, Japanese pop star nicknamed Ku or Kuu

== Places ==
- Kose-Uuemõisa, Estonia, a village
- Mount Ku, Kazakhstan
- North Kalimantan, Indonesia (vehicle registration prefix KU)

== Science ==
- K-U ratio, the ratio between potassium and uranium
- K_{u} band, a band of microwave radio frequencies in the electromagnetic spectrum
- Ku (protein), a protein involved in DNA repair
- Ku, the proposed chemical symbol for kurchatovium (later named rutherfordium)
- KU, Krebs units, a measure of the viscosity of paint

== Other uses ==
- Wards of Japan (区, ku), a type of city subdivision
- Kū or Kū-ka-ili-moku, the Hawaiian god of politics, agriculture, war and fishing
- Ku, original name of the Privilege Ibiza nightclub
- Kindle Unlimited, an e-book service from Amazon
- Kū or kyū, Japanese for the number nine, and a term in martial arts

== See also ==
- Coup (disambiguation), pronounced /ku:/
- COO (disambiguation)
