= Cookham railway station =

Railway station serving the village of Cookham, Berkshire, England

Coordinates: 51.557°N 0.722°W

Cookham
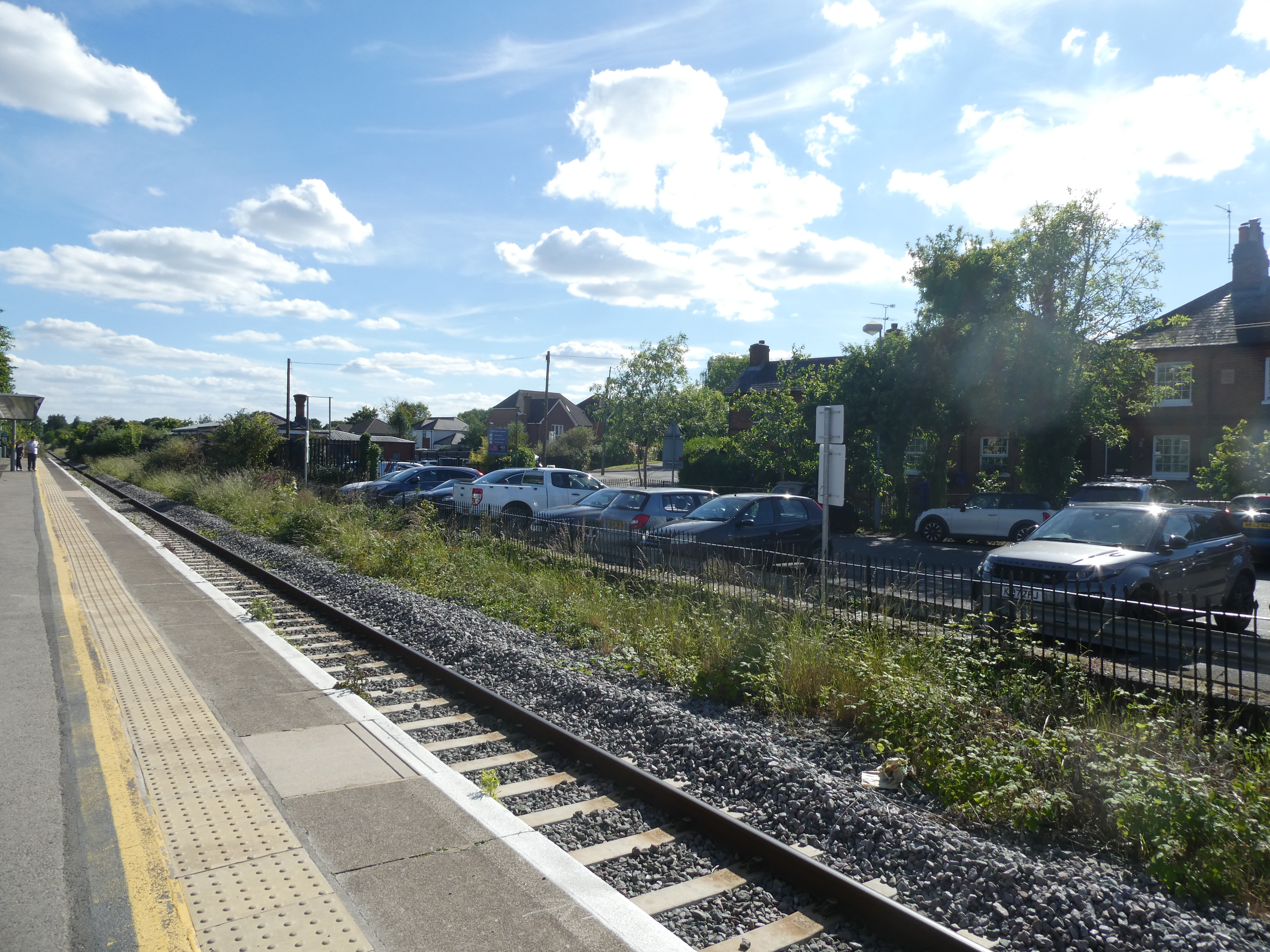
- Looking towards the former Down platform at Cookham taken from the Up platform.

General information
- Location: Cookham, Windsor and Maidenhead; England
- Grid reference: SU886850
- Managed by: Great Western Railway
- Platforms: 1

Other information
- Station code: COO
- Classification: DfT category E

History
- Opened: 1 August 1854
- Original company: Wycombe Railway
- Pre-grouping: Great Western Railway
- Post-grouping: Great Western Railway

Passengers
- 2020/21: ▼41,180
- 2021/22: ▲0.118 million
- 2022/23: ▲0.152 million
- 2023/24: ▲0.189 million
- 2024/25: ▲0.204 million
Location
Notes
- Passenger statistics from the Office of Rail and Road

Cookham railway station serves the village of Cookham, Berkshire, England. Great Western Railway trains between Maidenhead and Marlow serve the station on the Marlow branch line, but through services to and from London Paddington in peak hours Monday to Friday no longer run. It is 2 miles 73 chains (4.7 km) down the line from Maidenhead and 27 miles 12 chains (43.7 km) measured from Paddington.

Cookham station was opened by the Wycombe Railway in 1854. The station originally had two platforms, acting as a passing loop for trains. The station now has a single platform, but the remains of the second platform is still visible. The former Station House is now let to private occupants.

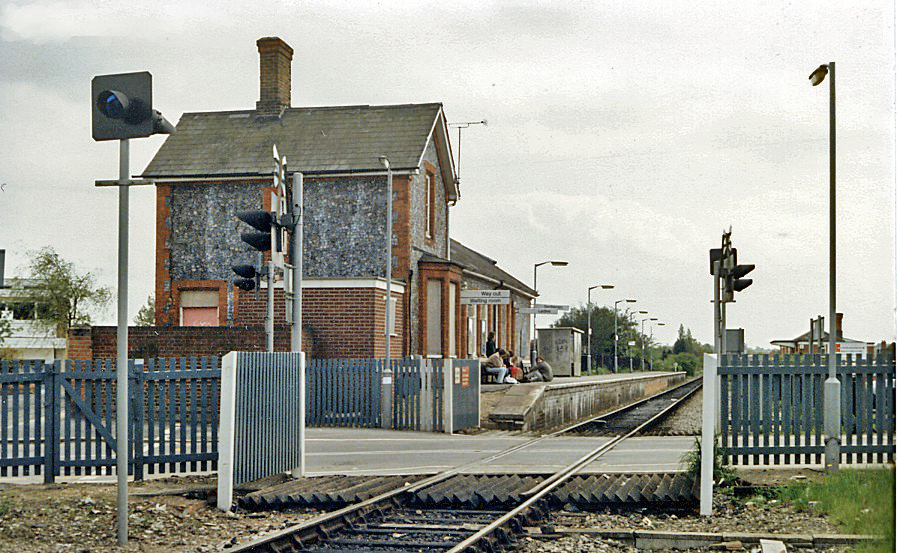
View from the road in 1986

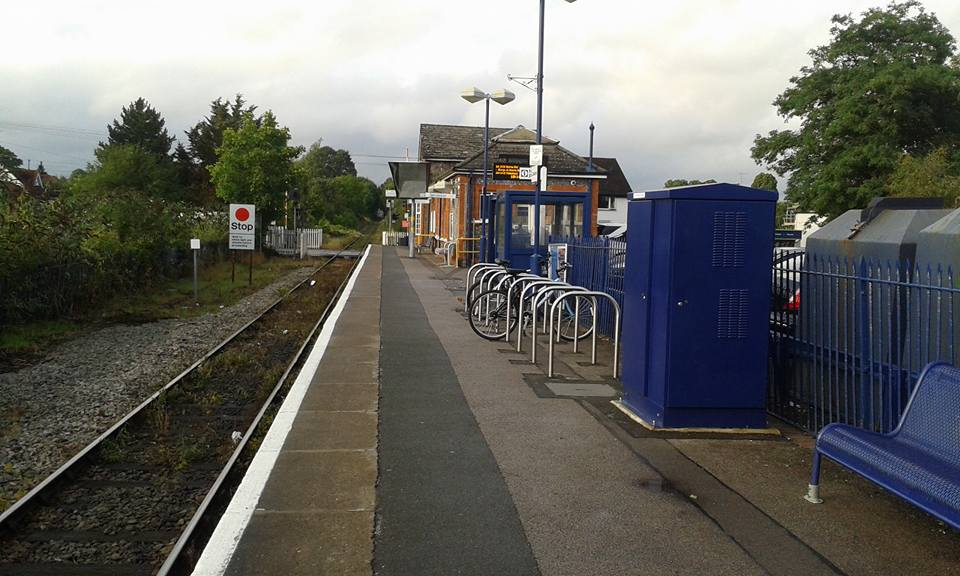
Looking down the line towards Marlow in 2015

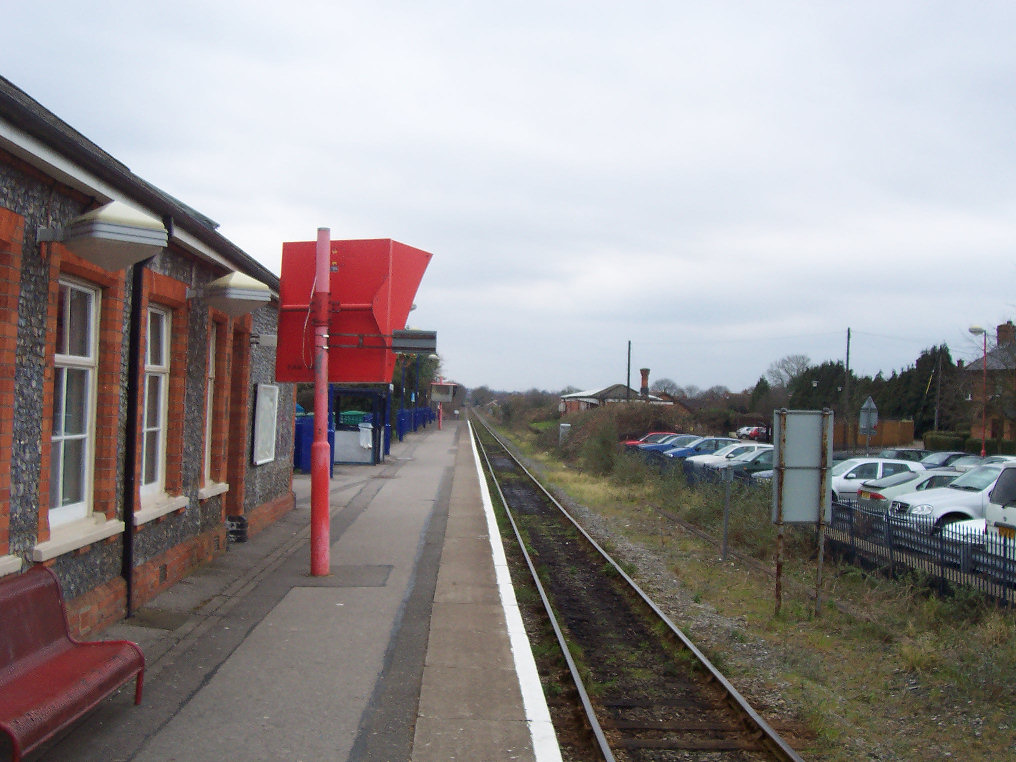
Looking Up towards Furze Platt

== Services ==
All services at Cookham are operated by Great Western Railway.

The typical off-peak service is one train per hour between Maidenhead and Marlow. During the peak hours, the service is increased to two trains per hour in each direction and northbound trains runs to and from Bourne End only, connecting with a half-hourly shuttle service between Bourne End and Marlow.

Preceding station	National Rail	Following station
Furze Platt	Great Western Railway Marlow Branch Line	Bourne End
	Historical railways	
Maidenhead Boyne Hill Line open, station closed	Great Western Railway Wycombe Railway	Bourne End Line and station open
