= Bourne End railway station =

Railway station serving the village of Bourne End, Buckinghamshire, England

Coordinates: 51.577°N 0.710°W

Bourne End
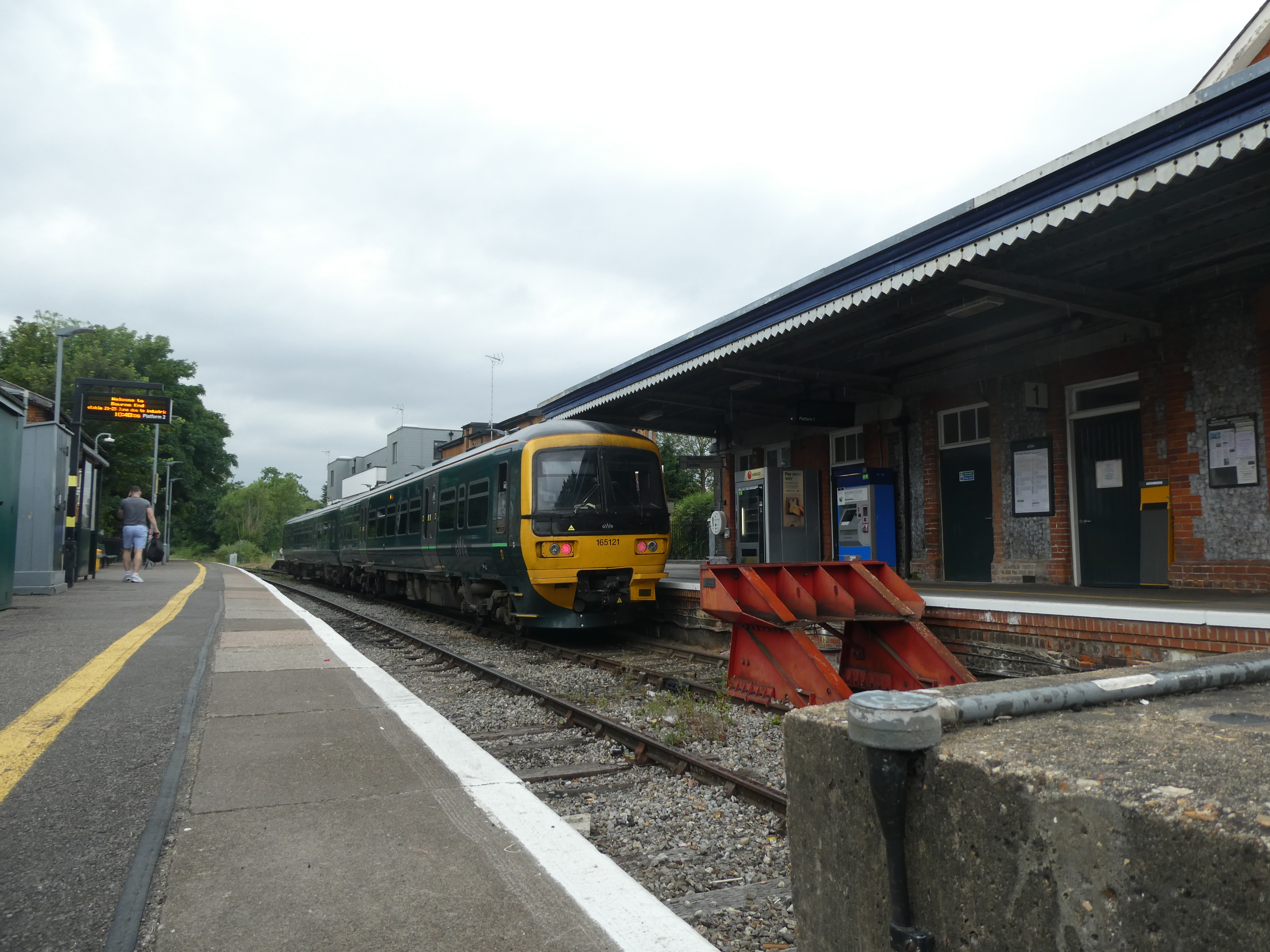
- Great Western Railway Class 165 121 DMU arrives from Maidenhead. The driver will now change ends to continue to Marlow.

General information
- Location: Bourne End, Buckinghamshire; England
- Grid reference: SU894872
- Managed by: Great Western Railway
- Platforms: 2

Other information
- Station code: BNE
- Classification: DfT category E

History
- Original company: Wycombe Railway
- Pre-grouping: Great Western Railway
- Post-grouping: GWR

Key dates
- 1 August 1854: Opened as Marlow Road
- 1873: Marlow branch opened
- 1874: Renamed Bourne End
- May 1970: line to High Wycombe closed

Passengers
- 2020/21: ▼61,366
- Interchange: ▼22,960
- 2021/22: ▲0.167 million
- Interchange: ▲65,042
- 2022/23: ▲0.194 million
- Interchange: ▲84,287
- 2023/24: ▲0.236 million
- Interchange: ▲0.101 million
- 2024/25: ▲0.255 million
- Interchange: ▲0.126 million
Location
Notes
- Passenger statistics from the Office of Rail and Road

Bourne End railway station is a railway station in Buckinghamshire, England, that serves Bourne End. It is on the Marlow Branch Line between Maidenhead and Marlow, 4 miles 36 chains (7.2 km) down the line from Maidenhead and 28 miles 55 chains (46.2 km) measured from London Paddington.

Services are provided by Great Western Railway. The ticket office is open on weekday and Saturday mornings. There is a customer car park south of the station. The station has two platforms.

== History ==
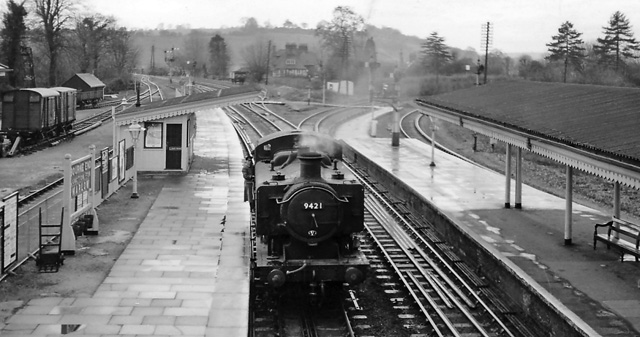
View SW, towards Marlow and Maidenhead in 1959

The station was originally named Marlow Road station. In 1874, Marlow Road station was renamed Bourne End to obviate confusion with the newly opened Marlow station.

The station was opened in 1854 as part of the Wycombe Railway Company line between Maidenhead Boyne Hill station and High Wycombe. To reach Bourne End, a wooden viaduct was built across Cockmarsh and a wooden bridge was built across the River Thames.

In 1873, a line linking Bourne End with Marlow was opened to the public, with 1,700 tickets being sold in the first week. Originally the branch line was served by a third platform on the west side of the station. The station also had a number of sidings, a goods shed, a railway hotel and a level crossing across Station Road. The goods shed was on the site where the Bourne End Auction Rooms now stand next to the station.

The service on the branch line is known locally as the "Marlow Donkey", which is commemorated by a local pub of the same name, although the origin of the term is unclear. The 'small' waiting room building from Bourne End Station (left of picture) lives on at Bourne Again Junction on the Fawley Hill Railway, home of the late Sir William McAlpine. A camping coach was positioned here by the Western Region in 1960.

== Partial closure ==
British Rail closed the line between Bourne End and High Wycombe in May 1970, but trains still run between Maidenhead and Marlow.

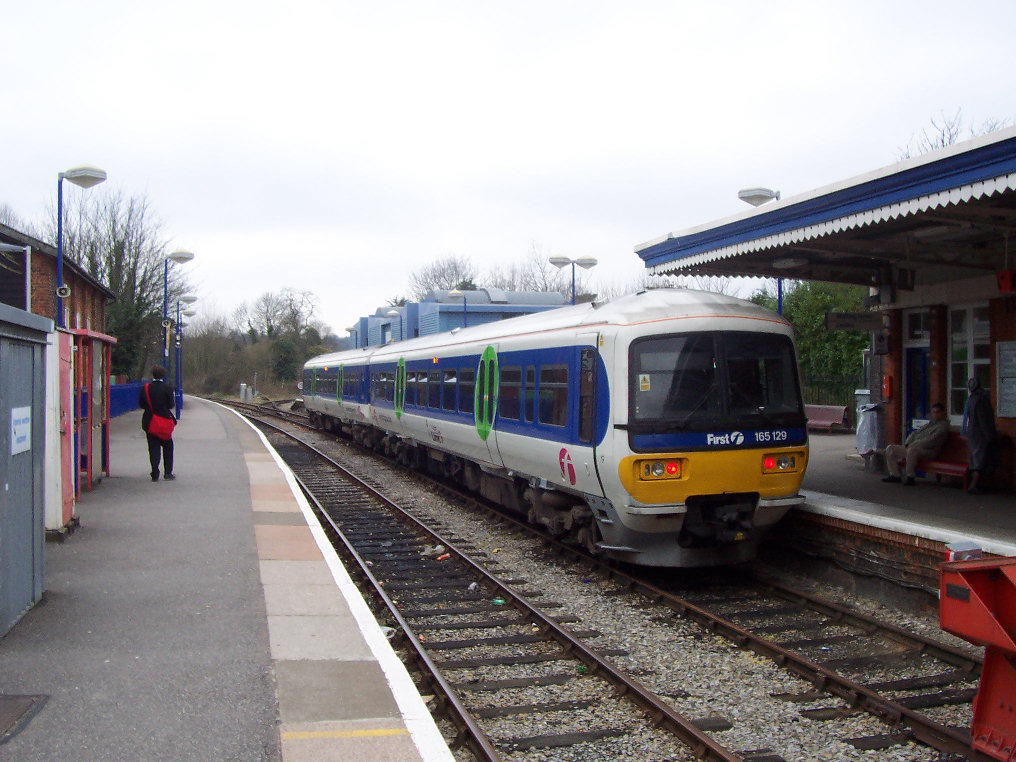
First Great Western Link 165 at Bourne End Station.

== Future ==
It has been proposed that the Line between Bourne End and High Wycombe be reopened. A feasibility study is under way to see if it is economic to do so.

== Services ==
Bourne End is a terminus but effectively acts as a through station, with the driver having to change ends to continue to the next station. During peak hours service frequency is increased by having two trains work the line, each using Bourne End as the terminus: one runs Marlow – Bourne End and one Maidenhead – Bourne End, with passengers changing trains at Bourne End. This service pattern is needed to meet peak-time demand, as the platforms at Bourne End are not long enough to accommodate longer trains. While Bourne End has two platforms, platform 2 is only accessible from Maidenhead and not from Marlow, and so cannot be used as a passing loop. Since May 2017 there are no through trains to London Paddington.

The basic daytime service runs hourly each way to Maidenhead & Marlow seven days a week, with the additional peak services operating half hourly Monday to Friday only.

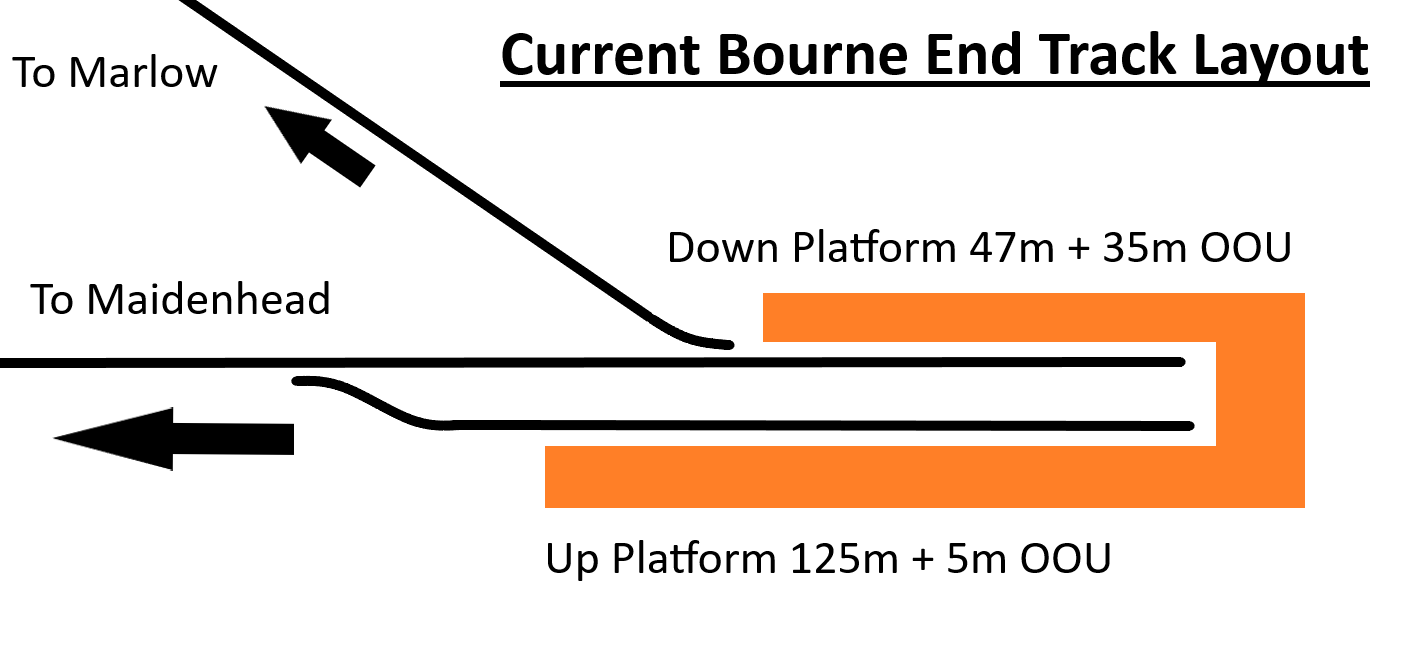
Shows the Current layout of Bourne End station on the Marlow Branch Line. Platform length data is from Network Rail's sectional appendix which is publicly available.

Preceding station	National Rail	Following station
Marlow	Great Western Railway; Marlow Branch Line	Terminus
Cookham	Great Western Railway; Marlow Branch Line	Terminus
	Disused railways	
Wooburn Green	Wycombe Railway; Until 1970	Cookham
