= Wycombe Railway =

Former railway line in England

The Wycombe Railway was a British railway between Maidenhead and Oxford that connected with the Great Western Railway at both ends; there was one branch, to Aylesbury.

== History ==
Wycombe Railway Act 1846
- Act of Parliament
- Parliament of the United Kingdom
- Long title: An Act for making a Railway from the Great Western Railway at Maidenhead in Berkshire to the Town of High Wycombe in the County of Buckingham.
- Citation: 9 & 10 Vict. c. ccxxxvi

Dates
- Royal assent: 27 July 1846

The Wycombe Railway Company was incorporated by an act of Parliament, the Wycombe Railway Act 1846 (9 & 10 Vict. c. ccxxxvi). The act authorised the construction of a single line railway from the Great Western Railway's Maidenhead railway station, then located close to the site of the current Taplow railway station. In 1852 construction started; the first section to be built was between Maidenhead and High Wycombe, and opened for passenger services on 1 August 1854. It linked the town of High Wycombe with the Great Western Main Line, and the Great Western Railway operated the services for the Wycombe Railway Company. The GWR had been built to Isambard Kingdom Brunel's broad gauge of 7 ft 1/4 in (2,140 mm), so the Wycombe Railway was also built to this gauge.

In 1862, the Wycombe Railway opened an extension from High Wycombe via Princes Risborough to Thame.

Wycombe Railway (Extensions to Oxford and Aylesbury) Act 1861
- Act of Parliament
- Parliament of the United Kingdom
- Long title: An Act to authorize the Wycombe Railway Company to extend their Railway to Aylesbury and to Oxford; and for other Purposes.
- Citation: 24 & 25 Vict. c. lxxxvii

Dates
- Royal assent: 28 June 1861

Wycombe Railway Amendment Act 1862
- Act of Parliament
- Parliament of the United Kingdom
- Long title: An Act to grant further Powers to the Wycombe Railway Company.
- Citation: 25 & 26 Vict. c. v

Dates
- Royal assent: 16 May 1862

The Wycombe Railway (Extensions to Oxford and Aylesbury) Act 1861 (24 & 25 Vict. c. lxxxvii) authorised two more branches. In 1863, it opened a branch line from Princes Risborough to Aylesbury. In 1864, it opened an extension from Thame to Kennington Junction on the GWR line between Didcot and Oxford, thus finally completing its route to Oxford.

Great Western Railway (Wycombe Railway Transfer) Act 1866
- Act of Parliament
- Parliament of the United Kingdom
- Long title: An Act to confirm an Agreement for the Transfer of the Wycombe Railway to the Great Western Railway Company.
- Citation: 29 & 30 Vict. c. ccliv

Dates
- Royal assent: 23 July 1866

Text of statute as originally enacted

Under the Great Western Railway (Wycombe Railway Transfer) Act 1866 (29 & 30 Vict. c. ccliv), the GWR took over the Wycombe Railway Company on 31 January 1867. The GWR converted the entire line to standard gauge in one week, between 23 August and 1 September 1870. The Risborough to Aylesbury section was converted to standard gauge two years earlier in 1868, the first line in England to be converted.

The Great Marlow Railway Company opened the branch between Bourne End and Marlow in 1873. As with the Wycombe Railway, it was a separate company but the GWR provided the train service. The GWR took over this company in 1897.

On 15 March 1899, the Great Western and Great Central Joint Railway opened between High Wycombe and Northolt Junction, giving the GWR a shorter route between High Wycombe and London Paddington. As a consequence the Wycombe Railway lost a proportion of its traffic.

=== Later developments ===
In 1963, British Railways closed the section between Princes Risborough and Kennington Junction to passenger traffic. The part of this section between Thame and Morris Cowley was closed to all traffic in 1968. BR closed the section between Bourne End and High Wycombe to freight traffic on 18 July 1966 and to passenger traffic on 4 May 1970. In 1991, BR closed the section between Princes Risborough and Thame, which hitherto had remained open for freight traffic to an oil depot at Thame. The section from the B4009 underbridge west of Princes Risborough to the A329 level crossing west of Thame was subsequently converted into a footpath and cycle track, the Phoenix Trail.

== Current and planned operating statuses ==
Three sections of the Wycombe Railway remain open. The line between Maidenhead and Bourne End carries GWR passenger trains as part of the Marlow Branch Line. The line between High Wycombe and Princes Risborough carries Chiltern Railways services as part of the Chiltern Main Line. The line between Kennington Junction and the former Morris Cowley station is open for freight traffic to and from the Mini (BMW) factory. This section is known as the Cowley branch line.

In 2025, it was announced that funding had been secured for the Cowley branch line to be re-opened for passenger services to Oxford, with two new stations at Oxford Cowley and Oxford Littlemore.

== The route between Maidenhead and High Wycombe ==
The route starts at Maidenhead, branching off the Great Western Main Line just to the west of Maidenhead's current station. The line turns north, and soon reaches the first intermediate stop, which was Maidenhead (Wycombe Junction), later renamed Maidenhead Boyne Hill. This station was situated on the Bath Road halfway up Castle Hill. The station closed in 1871 when the present Maidenhead railway station was opened. The entrance to Boyne Hill station can still be seen, though it is totally bricked up and thus inaccessible. Further intermediate stops – which are still open – are at Furze Platt and Cookham.

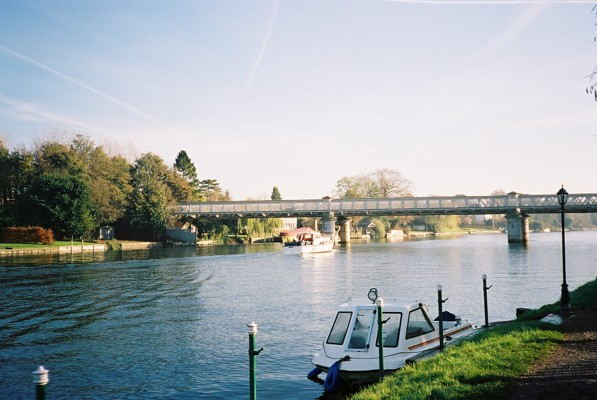
River Thames – Bourne End railway bridge

The railway originally crossed the Thames at Bourne End on a 12-span wooden bridge but this was replaced in 1895 by a 3-span steel structure. Bourne End, the next station after Cookham, was also an intermediate station, but is now terminus for this section of the line. The Great Marlow Railway branches westwards at Bourne End to Marlow. The original locomotive on this branch was nicknamed "The Marlow Donkey".

Before the closure of the line to High Wycombe it continued through Bourne End station, over the current Station Road and through the current RAC industrial estate. It approached Cores End, crossed the A4094 road and entered the agricultural areas of Wooburn Green. It then crossed several fields, behind land that is now occupied by Stratford Drive.

The line then reached Wooburn Green. Wooburn Green railway station had a single platform as the line was single track. From the early 1960s, the station was unstaffed.

From Wooburn Green, the trackbed followed the north end of Flackwell Heath Golf Course. Just before the line entered Loudwater, it went under the current M40 motorway to Birmingham. Although the M40 was built after the dismantling of the track, the alignment was preserved with an overbridge, which can be viewed today from the A4094 past The Dreams Store, towards Wycombe Marsh.

At Loudwater railway station, as at Wooburn Green, the original layout was a single platform. The station was at the bottom of Treadaway Hill just after the M40 bridge. The railway conservation footpath is on one side of the road which follows the original path of the railway.

The line crossed Treadaway Hill on a level crossing and entered a wooded area. Here it passed over its first underbridge of the route, Spring Lane, which has since been removed. Then it passed under the first overbridge of the route, the Abbey Barn Road bridge. The line then progressed towards The Rye area, and at what is now the Willow Court housing estate, turned sharply northwest towards Oxford Road. Here the second underbridge of the route passed over Bowden Lane, onto an embankment, towards London Road. It continued northwest until a steel girder bridge took it over A40 road, onto another embankment that took the line to what is now the Chiltern Line. Here it joins the Great Western and Great Central Joint Railway from Northolt Junction, which ran alongside it into High Wycombe railway station.

In 2008, Parliament passed the Crossrail Act 2008 (c. 18) to build a new cross-London line with its services terminating at Maidenhead. The preservation of the alignment of the former Wycombe Railway from property development is being considered, in order to keep viable the option to reopen this part of the Wycombe Railway to enhance north – south communications in south Buckinghamshire.

In 2017, Wycombe District Council approved a two-year study into the feasibility of the route. £100,000 is to be spent assessing the route which had previously been earmarked as a light rail corridor. With Crossrail reaching Maidenhead by December 2019, a heavy rail option is being explored.

In January 2019, Campaign for Better Transport released a report identifying the line was listed as Priority 2 for reopening. Priority 2 is for those lines which require further development or a change in circumstances (such as housing developments).

== See also ==
- Marlow Branch Line
