= COO =

COO, coo, or Coo may refer to:

== Business ==
- Chief operating officer, a high-ranking corporate officer of an organization
- Certificate of origin, used in international trade
- Concept of operations, used in Systems Engineering Management Process
- Country of origin, a representative to the country or countries of manufacture, production, design, or brand origin where an article or product comes from

== Communication ==
- "Coo", the call of pigeons and doves
- "Coo", or "cooing", a type of human baby vocalization
- Cell of origin, a mobile-positioning technique for finding a caller's cell

== People ==
- Coo Coo Cal, a stage name of American rapper Calvin Bellamy (born 1970)
- Coo Coo Marlin (1932–2005), a racing driver
- Clara Oswin Oswald, a fictional character

== Science ==
- Carboxylate, a type of anion
- Cobalt(II) oxide, a chemical compound with the formula CoO

== Places ==
- Coo, the Italian name for the Dodecanese island Kos, now in Greece, off the coast of Turkey
- Calgary Olympic Oval, a Canadian ice rink
- Cadjehoun Airport, Cotonou, Benin (IATA code: COO)
- Cookham railway station, Berkshire, England (National Rail code: COO)

== Other uses ==
- Daihatsu Coo, a 2006–2012 Japanese subcompact hatchback
- Tōi Umi kara Kita Coo, a 1998 Japanese novel and anime film
- Summer Days with Coo, a 2007 Japanese animated film
- Coo, a scotticism for a cow
- Comox language (ISO 639-3 code: coo)
- The Cooper Companies, an American medical device company (Nasdaq ticker symbol: COO)
- Coo, an owl-like character in the Kirby series
