= Coup d'état (disambiguation) =

A coup d'état (often referred to as a coup) is the sudden overthrow of a government through unconstitutional means.

Coup d'état may also refer to:

== Films ==
- Coup d'État (1973 film), a Japanese film directed by Yoshishige Yoshida
- Coup d'Etat, the working title for film Dear Dictator (2018)
- Coup d'Etat, an Australian television documentary about the four days of nonviolent military revolt that ousted President Ferdinand Marcos

== Literature ==
- Coup d'État: The Technique of Revolution, a 1931 book by Curzio Malaparte
- Coup d'État: A Practical Handbook, a 1969 book by Edward Luttwak
- Coup D'Etat in America: The CIA and the Assassination of JFK, a 1975 book by A.J. Weberman

== Music ==
- Coup D'etat (band), a New Zealand rock band from the early 1980s and their self-titled sole album
- Coup d'Etat (Plasmatics album), a 1982 album by Plasmatics
- Coup d'etat (Muslimgauze album), a 1987 album by Muslimgauze
- Coup d'Etat (G-Dragon album), a 2013 album by G-Dragon
  - Coup d'Etat (song)
- "Coup d'Etat", a song by Level 42 on the album World Machine
- "Coup d'etat", a song by Refused on the album Songs to Fan the Flames of Discontent
- "Coup d'État", a song by Circle Jerks on the album Golden Shower of Hits
- "Coup d'Etat", a song by Henry Jackman on the album X-men: First Class

== Other uses ==
- Coup d'etat (comics), a 2004 crossover event published by Wildstorm Comics
- "Coup D'etat" (Stargate Atlantis), a 2006 television episode

== See also ==
- Coup (disambiguation)
