= Koo =

Koo or KOO may refer to:

- Kōō (1389–1390), a Japanese era
- KOO, a South African food brand
- Koo (social network), an Indian microblogging and social networking service
- Koo Koo, a 1981 Debbie Harry album
- Kõo, village in Viljandi County, Estonia

== People ==
- Koo Chen-fu (1917–2005), Taiwanese businessman and diplomat
- Koo Chung, Korean-American singer-songwriter
- Koo Dae-Sung (born 1969), South Korean baseball player
- Koo Hsien-jung (1866–1937), Taiwanese businessman and politician
- Koo Ki-Lan (born 1977), South Korean volleyball player
- Koo Kien Keat (born 1985), Malaysian badminton player
- Koo-Koo the Bird Girl, who suffered from Virchow-Seckel syndrome
- Koo Stark (born 1956), American film actress and photographer
- Koo Hye-sun, a South Korean actress and singer
- Jaha Koo (born 1984), Korean theater creator, composer, and video artist
- Jeffrey Koo Sr. (born 1933), Taiwanese banker
- Joseph Koo, MBE, SBS, (born 1933,), Hong Kong composer
- Josephine Koo (Chinese: 顧美華), Chinese actress
- Kaija Koo (born 1962), Finnish singer
- Linda Koo (born 1954), Hong Kong epidemiologist
- Louis Koo, Hong Kong actor
- Koo Sze-yiu, Hong Kong activists
- Wellington Koo, Chinese diplomat
- Younghoe Koo, American football player

== Fictionals ==
- Hari Koo, a protagonist in the anime series Shinbi's Haunted House
- Doori Koo, a protagonist in the anime series Shinbi's Haunted House

== See also ==
- Koo-Vee, a Finnish ice hockey team based at Tampere
- Koo-Vee (ice hockey), a Finnish ice hockey team based at Tampere
- Nathan Koo-Boothe (born 1985), English-Jamaican footballer
- Tai Koo (disambiguation)
