= Wooburn Green railway station =

Former railway station in England

Coordinates: 51.5879°N 0.6853°W

Wooburn Green
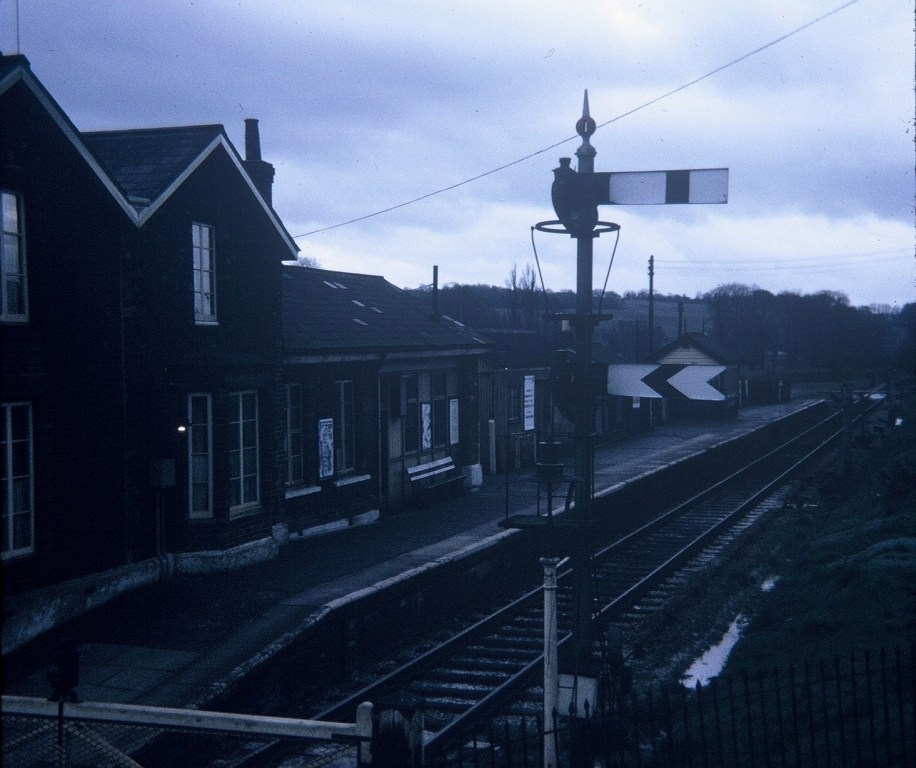
- The station just before closure in April 1970

General information
- Location: Wooburn Green, Buckinghamshire; England
- Grid reference: SU911884
- Platforms: 1

Other information
- Status: Disused

History
- Original company: Wycombe Railway
- Pre-grouping: Great Western Railway
- Post-grouping: Great Western Railway

Key dates
- 1 August 1854: Opened as Woburn Green
- October 1872: Name changed to Wooburn Green
- 4 May 1970: Closed
Location

Wooburn Green railway station was a railway station which served Wooburn Green, Buckinghamshire, England, on the Wycombe Railway. It was opened in 1854, with the station located near the bottom of Whitepit lane. The station became a halt in 1968 because of a decreased service on the line.

The station and line were closed in 1970. Unlike Loudwater station (demolished in the mid-1970s for development), the station platform and building remained in situ as a private dwelling, until the late 1980s. The station was demolished to make way for the Old Station Way development, built around 1990. A railway conservation path follows the route of the former railway towards Bourne End.

Preceding station	Disused railways	Following station
Loudwater	Wycombe Railway; Until 1970	Bourne End
