= Cell of origin =

Cell of origin (COO) is a mobile-positioning technique for finding a caller's cell (the basic geographical coverage unit of a cellular telephone system) location.

== Overview ==
Crude COO positioning considers the location of the base station to be the location of the caller. This is not very accurate, as the majority of mobile network cells are projected from an antenna with a spread of 120° (i.e. three mounted on a mast to give complete coverage) giving a signal coverage area with the base station at one corner, rather than the centre. Omnidirectional cells may be used in rural locations (which typically have large ranges and hence uncertain locations for phones within them) and in cities (where they may have ranges of a few hundred metres). The underlying issue is that mobile phone networks are optimised for capacity and call handling rather than locating phones.

== Mechanism ==
Most commercially implemented systems rely on 'enhanced' COO. In the GSM system this relies on the fact that the phones constantly measure the signal strength from the closest 6 base stations and lock on to the strongest signal (the reality is slightly more complex than this and includes parameters that each individual network can optimise, including signal quality and variability. Most networks endeavour to optimise for minimum power consumption, but the overall effect approximates to each phone locking onto the strongest signal).

All networks generate 'splash maps' predicting signal coverage when planning and managing their networks. These maps can be processed to analyse the area which will be dominated by each base station and to approximate each area by a circle (the actual area of coverage may not be exactly where predicted... and in any case will be an irregular shape, rather than a circle).

== Application ==
In practice a network offering location services to third parties will present an API to which queries can be sent by validated users, to which a reply will be sent comprising the centre of a circle and a radius representing the expected error (the size of the circle in which the phone is expected to be). For this reason, when precision is important COO is often used in conjunction with some other technology, such as the Global Positioning System (GPS) or Time of Arrival (TOA).

COO is the only positioning technique that is widely used in wireless networks and is used for Phase 1 of 911 service in the United States. Location services using COO have been adopted by the emergency services in many countries. Commercial services have been slower to take off than many in the industry expected. One of the first services to make widespread use of COO based mobile location was the Zingo taxi hailing system, launched in London in 2003.
