= Linda Koo =

Chinese cancer epidemiologist

Linda Chih-ling Koo (born 1954 in Thailand), is a Chinese cancer epidemiologist and former lecturer at the University of Hong Kong. She is known for her studies on the relationship between indoor pollution, dietary factors, and lung cancer in China.

== Research ==
Her research has included examining the links between passive smoking, incense burning and lung cancer, speculating that these linkages are confounded by poor dietary and lifestyle habits.

== Tobacco industry links ==
She has been criticized for her ties to the tobacco industry, which attempted to recruit her as a consultant because she had said she thought that lung cancer was mainly caused by dietary factors.

She has acted as a consultant to the tobacco industry, which often cited her research on confounding factors to argue that passive smoking might not cause lung cancer. In a confidential 1989 industry memo, Covington & Burling lawyer John Rupp wrote that "‘‘we have reestablished a productive ongoing working relationship with Dr. Linda Koo, who is the single most prominent ETS scientist in all of Asia. Although Dr. Koo...cannot afford formally to join our group, the ability we have developed to consult with her should pay substantial dividends."

== 1992 plagiarism controversy ==
In 1992, Koo's University of Hong Kong colleague Lam Tai-hing was found guilty of plagiarizing Koo's questionnaire, which she had devised with her colleague John Ho to study lung cancer among nonsmoking Chinese women. This guilty verdict was upheld by the Court of Appeal the following year, whereupon the university subsequently announced that Tai-Hing would be investigated by a university committee. In 1995, this committee found Tai-Hing not guilty of "disgraceful or dishonorable" conduct, a decision which Koo and Ho appealed to a judicial review later that year. On October 24, 1995, the university rejected Koo and Ho's appeal.
