= Coup de Grâce =

A coup de grâce is a finishing blow.

Coup de Grâce may also refer to:

- Coup de Grâce (1969 film), an Argentinian comedy
- Coup de Grâce (1976 film), a film by Volker Schlöndorff
- "Coup de Grace" (CSI), an episode of the TV series CSI: Crime Scene Investigation
- Coup de Grâce (novel), a novel by Marguerite Yourcenar, basis for the 1976 film
- Coup de Grâce, a technique in professional wrestling

In music:

- Coup de Grâce (Ja Rule album)
- Coup de Grace (Miles Kane album), 2018
- Coup de Grâce (Mink DeVille album)
- Coup de Grace (Orange Goblin album)
- Coup de Grace (The Plasmatics album)
- Coup de Grâce (SeeYouSpaceCowboy album)
- Coup de Grace (The Stranglers album)
- Coup de Grace (Treat album)
- Coup de Grâce (Best of Koop 1997–2007), an album
- The Death of Slim Shady (Coup de Grâce), the twelfth studio album by Eminem
- Coup de Grâce, a power electronics music project by Michael Moynihan
- "Coup de grâce", part of the Call of Duty: Modern Warfare 2 soundtrack by Hans Zimmer
- "Coup de Grâce", a song by Phinehas from the album Till the End
- "Coup de Grâce", a song by Warmen from the album Band of Brothers
