= Maidenhead railway station =

Station serving the town of Maidenhead, Berkshire, England

Maidenhead
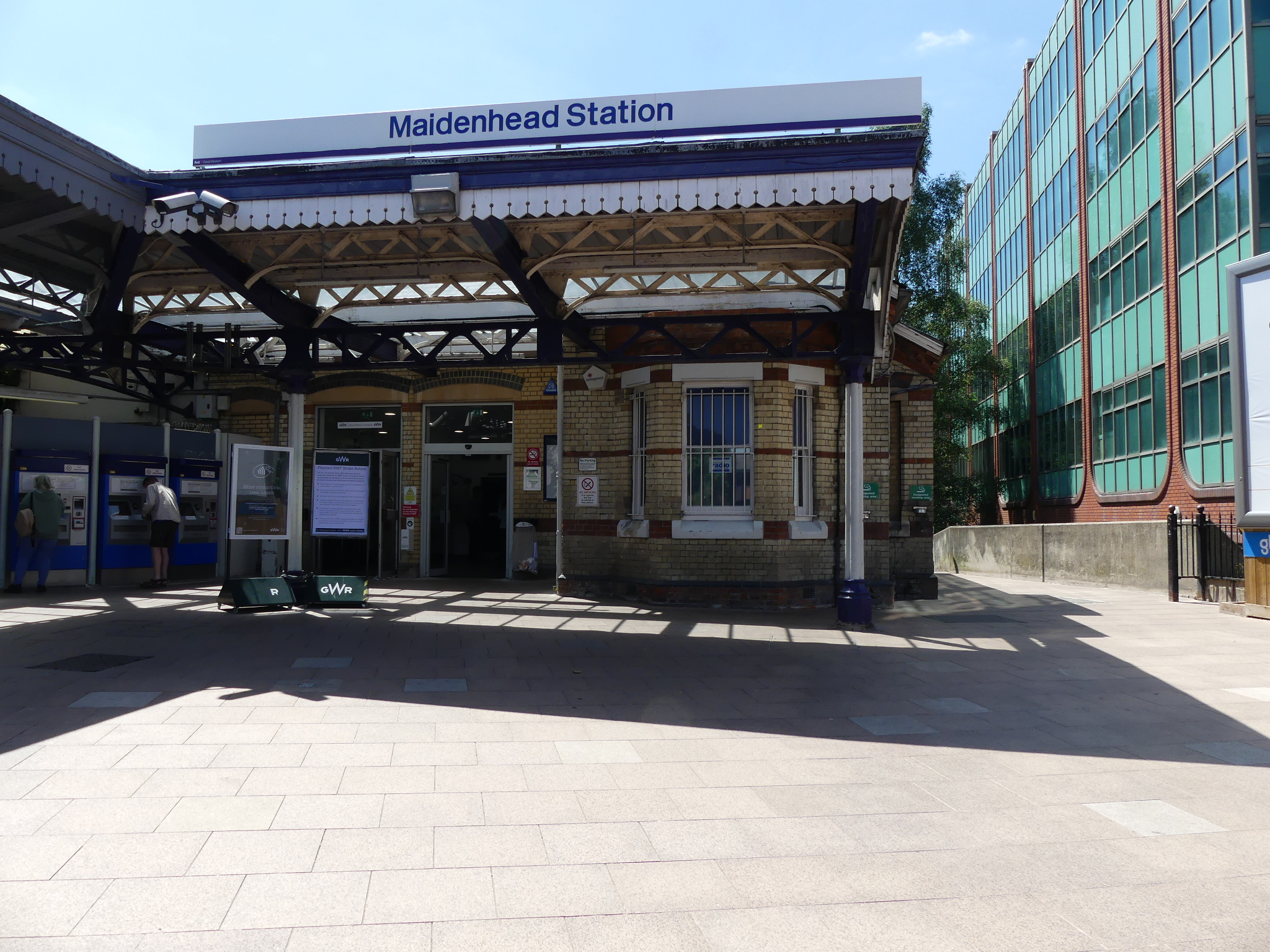
- Station entrance seen in June 2022

General information
- Location: Royal Borough of Windsor and Maidenhead; England
- Coordinates: 51.519°N 0.723°W
- Grid reference: SU886807
- Owner: Network Rail
- Manager: Great Western Railway
- Platforms: 5

Other information
- Station code: MAI
- Classification: DfT category C1

History
- Original company: Great Western Railway

Key dates
- 1 November 1871: Opened

Passengers
- 2021/22: ▲2.410 million
- Interchange: ▲0.309 million
- 2022/23: ▲3.240 million
- Interchange: ▲0.421 million
- 2023/24: ▲4.392 million
- Interchange: ▲0.585 million
- 2024/25: ▲4.850 million
- Interchange: ▲0.645 million
- 2025/26: ▲5.222 million
- Interchange: ▲0.646 million
Location
Notes
- Passenger statistics from the Office of Rail and Road

Maidenhead railway station serves the market town of Maidenhead, Berkshire, England. It is 24 miles 19 chains (39.0 km) down the line from London Paddington and is situated between Taplow to the east and Twyford to the west. It opened in 1871 as Maidenhead Junction.

It is served by local services operated by Great Western Railway and the Elizabeth line, and is also the junction for the Marlow Branch Line. It has five platforms which are accessed through ticket barriers at both entrances to the station. The Marlow line platform had an overall roof until 2014 when it was removed in the course of electrification works.

== History ==
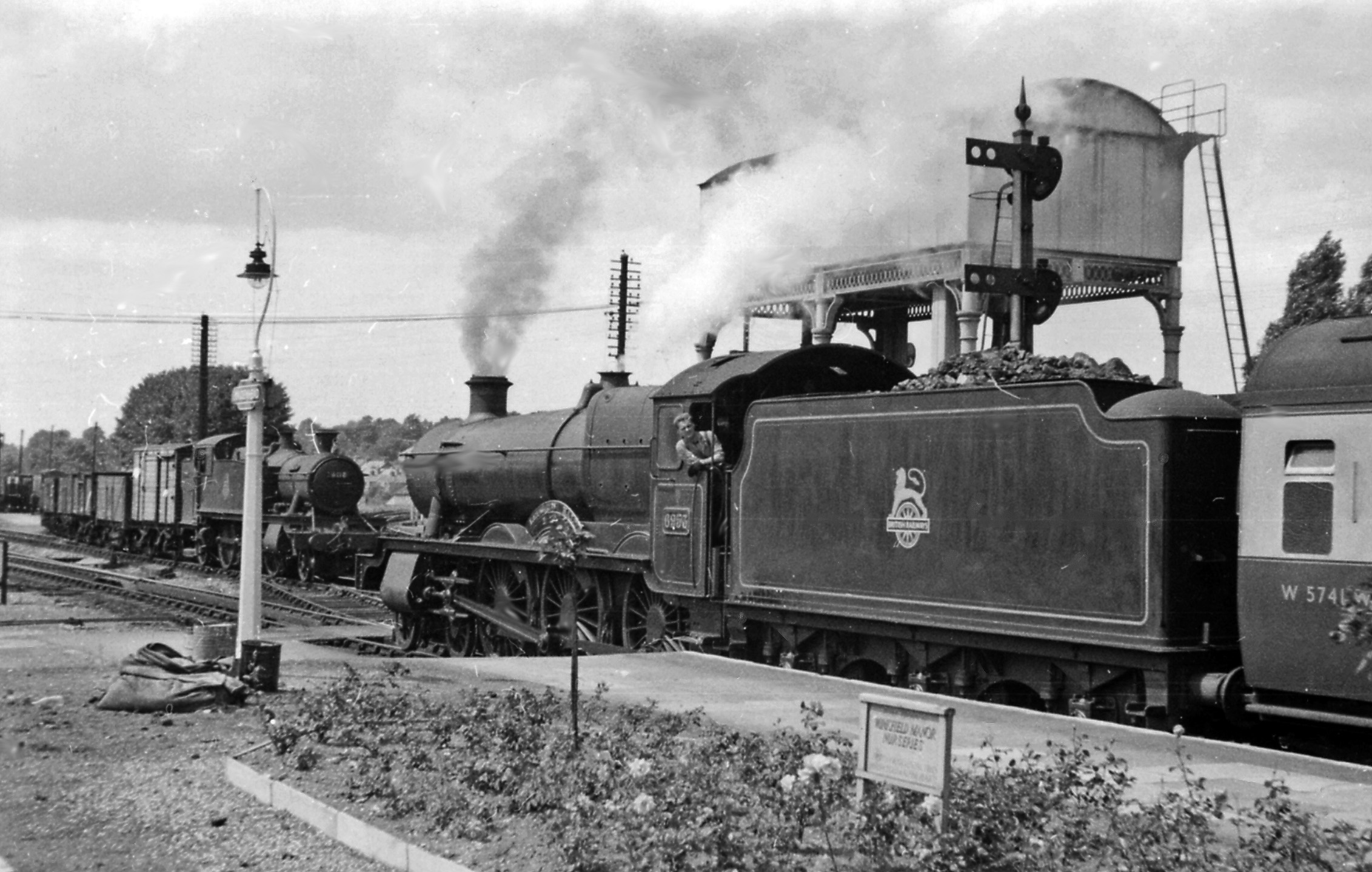
Maidenhead station in 1953

The station is on the original line of the Great Western Railway, which opened as far as Reading in 1840. The original Maidenhead Station lay east of the Thames, not far from the present Taplow station. This was the line's first terminus, pending the completion of the Sounding Arch (Maidenhead Railway Bridge) bridge over the river. In 1854, the Wycombe Railway Company built a line from Maidenhead to High Wycombe, with a station on Castle Hill, at first called "Maidenhead (Wycombe Branch)", later renamed "Maidenhead Boyne Hill". However, there was no station on the present site until 1871, when local contractor William Woodbridge built it. Originally, it was called "Maidenhead Junction", but eventually it came to replace the Boyn Hill station as well as the original station on the Maidenhead Riverside.

In 2008 the station underwent major renovation works and in 2010 a statue of Nicholas Winton was installed on one of the platforms.

In 2010 a statue was erected to honour the man dubbed the "British Schindler" for his work saving Jewish children from Nazi invasion. Sir Nicholas Winton was 29 when he smuggled 669 boys and girls, destined for concentration camps, out of Czechoslovakia in 1939. The statue, on platform three, depicts Winton sitting on a bench reading his famous scrapbook, which contained lists of all the children he helped to save.

=== Crossrail ===
Initially, the planned western terminus for the Crossrail project was Maidenhead, but an announcement was made in 2014 that it would be Reading. Some peak Elizabeth line trains terminate at Maidenhead, with two per hour continuing to Reading, so sidings have been built at Maidenhead to support this.

The station has undergone significant modification, including the replacement of the existing passenger waiting facilities, a new ticket hall, lifts, platform extensions to accommodate the longer trains, the introduction of overhead line equipment and the construction of new stabling and turnback facilities to the west of the station.

== Platform layout ==
The main entrance to the station is on the A308 with a back entrance on Shoppenhangers Road. The station has five through platforms and no terminating platforms:

- Platform 1 – For westbound trains on the main line. This platform is mainly used during peak times, as outside these times few trains on the main line stop at Maidenhead. It is outside of the ticket barriers at Shoppenhangers Road and the gate to the platform is only opened when a train is due to arrive.
- Platform 2 – For eastbound trains on the main line. This platform is mainly used during peak times, as outside these times few trains on the main line stop at Maidenhead.
- Platform 3 – For westbound trains on the relief line. The concourse is shared with platform 2.
- Platform 4 – For eastbound trains on the relief line.
- Platform 5 – For trains serving the Marlow branch line. Trains either begin/terminate here or continue to or from London on the relief line. This shares a concourse with platform 4.

== Services ==
Services at Maidenhead are operated by the Elizabeth line and Great Western Railway.

The typical off-peak service in trains per hour (tph) is:

=== Elizabeth Line ===
- 4 tph to Abbey Wood
- 2 tph to Reading

=== Great Western Railway ===
- 2 tph to Didcot Parkway
- 2 tph to London Paddington (calls at Slough only)
- 1 tph to Marlow

Additional Elizabeth line services call at the station during the peak hours. In addition, the service to Marlow increases to 2 tph and runs to and from Bourne End only, connecting with a 2 tph shuttle service between Bourne End and Marlow.

On Sundays, the semi-fast services between London Paddington and Didcot Parkway are reduced to hourly.

Preceding station	National Rail	Following station
Twyford	Great Western Railway Great Western Main Line	Slough
Twyford	Great Western Railway Great Western Main Line	Taplow Limited Service
Terminus	Great Western Railway Marlow Branch Line	Furze Platt
Elizabeth line
Twyford towards Reading	Elizabeth line	Taplow towards Abbey Wood

== Bibliography ==
- Butt, R.V.J. (1995). The Directory of Railway Stations. Yeovil: Patrick Stephens Ltd. ISBN 1-85260-508-1. R508.
- Over, Luke (September 2001). Delaney, Peter (ed.). "The Railway Comes to Maidenhead". Wargrave Local History Society. Archived from the original on 25 March 2005.
