= Coup (disambiguation) =

Coup is typically used as the short form of the phrase coup d'état, a sudden overthrow of a government.

Coup or The Coup may also refer to:

== Film and television ==
- Coup (film), a 2023 American comedy/thriller film
- "Coup" (November 17, 2019), a season 3 episode of The Crown
- "The Coup" (Smash), an episode of Smash
- "The Coup" (The Office), an episode of The Office
- The Coup, the former working title of the film No Escape (2015)

== Games ==
- Coup (bridge), various techniques of play in contract bridge
- Coup (board game), a 1975 board game by F.X. Schmid
- Coup (card game), a 2012 card-based social deduction game

== Literature ==
- The Coup (novel), by John Updike 1978
- The Coup, a play by Mustapha Matura 1991

== Music ==
- Coup (album), a 2008 album by The New Regime
- The Coup, an American hip hop group

== Other uses ==
- Counting coup, a Native American show of bravery
- Coup contrecoup injury, a type of head injury
- Coup d'oeil, assessing an entire situation in a glance
- Coup de main, a swift attack that relies on speed and surprise to accomplish its objectives in a single blow
- William C. Coup (1836–1895), an American businessman, partner of P. T. Barnum's

== See also ==
- Champagne coupe, a kind of Champagne glass
- Coop (disambiguation)
- Coup d'état (disambiguation)
- Coup de Grâce (disambiguation)
- Coupé, an automotive body style
