= Loudwater railway station =

Former railway station in England

Coordinates: 51.6049°N 0.7014°W

Loudwater
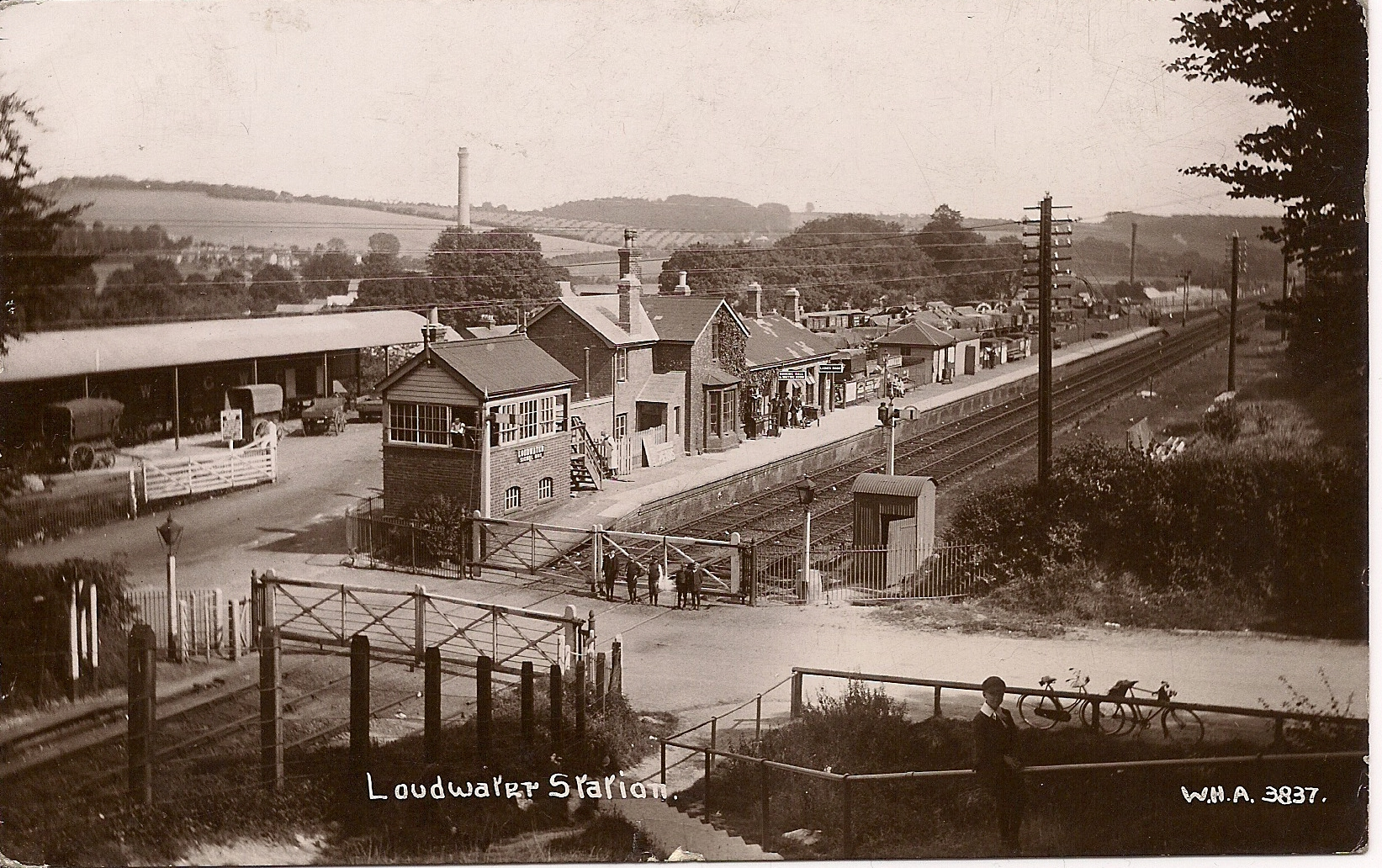

General information
- Location: Loudwater, Buckinghamshire; England
- Grid reference: SU900903
- Platforms: 2 (reduced to 1 in 1968)

Other information
- Status: Disused

History
- Original company: Wycombe Railway
- Pre-grouping: Great Western Railway
- Post-grouping: Great Western Railway

Key dates
- 1 Aug 1854: Opened
- 4 May 1970: Closed
Location

Loudwater railway station was a railway station which served Loudwater, Buckinghamshire and Flackwell Heath, on the Wycombe Railway.

== History ==
Loudwater station was located at the bottom of Treadaway Hill close to the M40 bridge and served both Loudwater and Flackwell Heath. It opened in 1854 and the station became a halt in 1968 because of decreased service on the line. The station was closed and demolished in 1970. The site is now an industrial park, although at the rear of the park the old railway tunnel under the M40 is still in place. A railway conservation path towards High Wycombe follows the route of the former railway.

== Routes ==
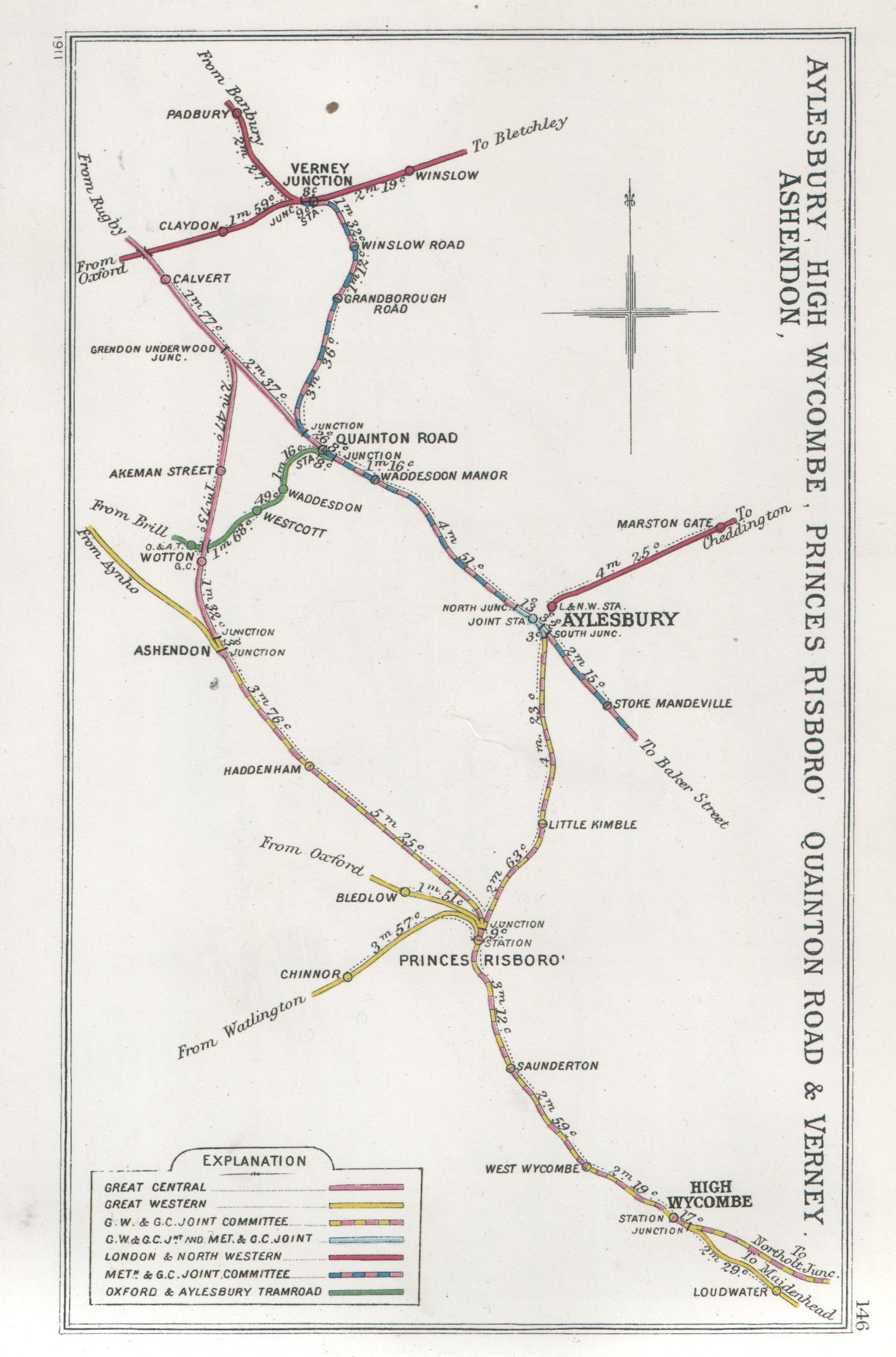
A 1911 Railway Clearing House map of railways in the vicinity of Loudwater

| Preceding station | Disused railways | Following station |
|---|---|---|
| High Wycombe | Wycombe Railway; Until 1970 | Wooburn Green |

== In popular culture ==
The station appears briefly in an early scene of The Reptile (1966) made by Hammer Film Productions.
