= Maidenhead Boyne Hill railway station =

Former railway station in England

Maidenhead Boyne Hill

General information
- Location: Maidenhead, Windsor and Maidenhead; England
- Coordinates: 51.522382°N 0.729408°W
- Grid reference: SU882811

Other information
- Status: Disused

History
- Original company: Wycombe Railway
- Pre-grouping: Great Western Railway

Key dates
- 1 August 1854: Opened as Maidenhead (Wycombe Branch)
- 1866: Renamed Maidenhead Boyne Hill
- 1 November 1871: Closed
Location

Maidenhead Boyne Hill railway station was built by the Wycombe Railway to serve the western part of Maidenhead. It was opened in 1854 and closed in 1871.

== History ==
The station was opened on 1 August 1854 along with five other intermediate stations on the Wycombe Railway's route between Maidenhead and Wycombe. It was situated on Castle Hill close to the point where the line passes under the Bath Road (the present day A4).

The station, at first named Maidenhead (Wycombe Branch), was later renamed Maidenhead (Boyne Hill).

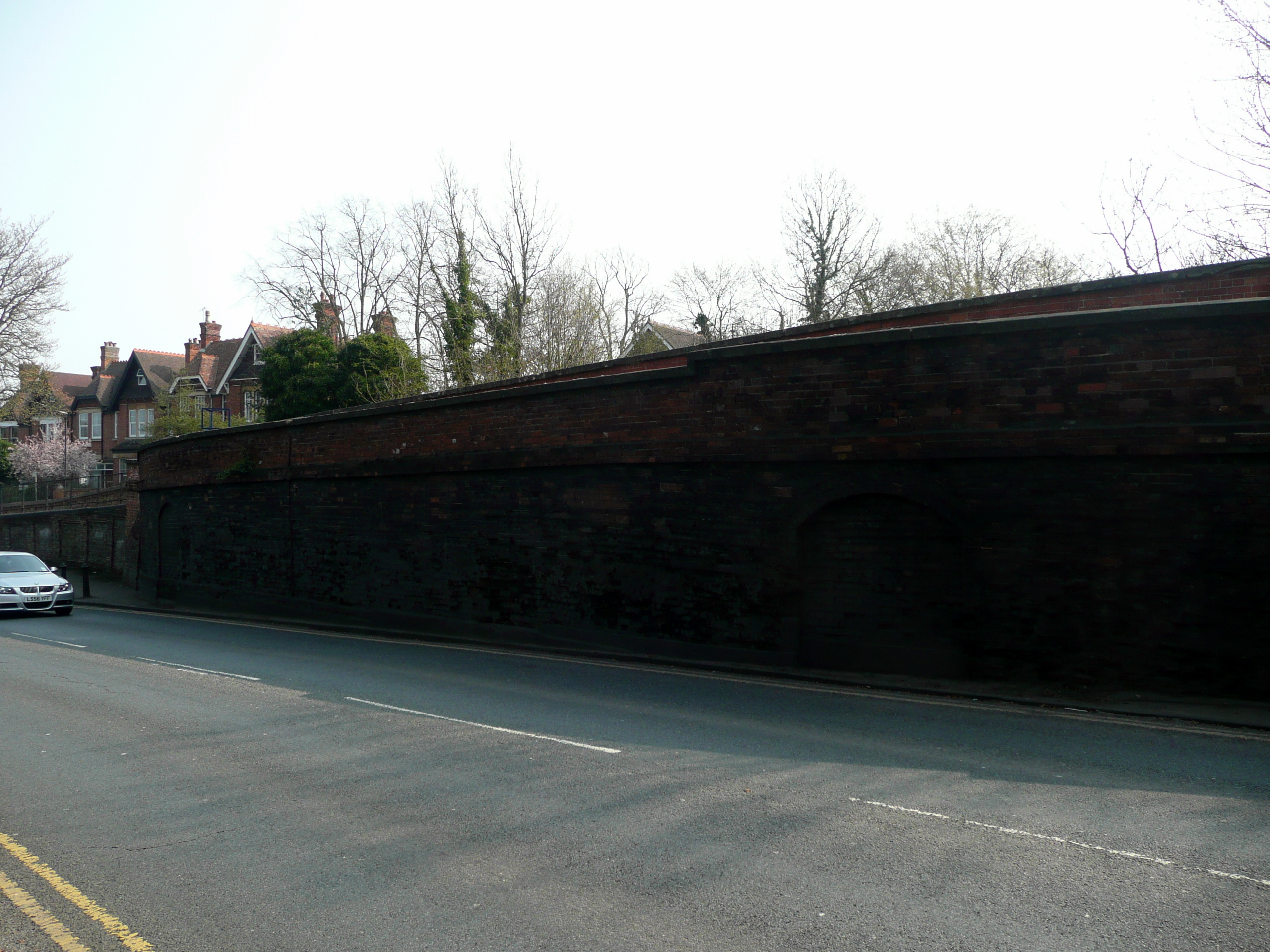
The site of the station in 2011

Maidenhead Boyne Hill closed on 1 November 1871, being replaced the same day by Maidenhead Junction, a new station which was built to serve the whole of Maidenhead. The line remains open for passenger services between Maidenhead and Marlow. The bricked up arches which led to the platforms can still be seen in the southern parapet of the bridge, beneath the footpath.

== Route ==
Preceding station	Historical railways	Following station
Maidenhead and Taplow; Line open, station closed	Great Western Railway; Wycombe Railway	Cookham; Line and station open
