= K-U ratio =

Measure of volatile elements on planets

The K/U Ratio is the ratio of a slightly volatile element, potassium (K), to a highly refractory element, uranium (U). It is a useful way to measure the presence of volatile elements on planetary surfaces. The K/U ratio helps explain the evolution of the planetary system and the origin of Earth's Moon.

== Volatile and refractory elements ==
In planetary science, volatiles are the group of chemical elements and chemical compounds with low boiling points that are associated with a planet's or a moon's crust or atmosphere.

Very low boiling temperature examples include nitrogen, water, carbon dioxide, ammonia, hydrogen, methane and sulfur dioxide.

In contrast with volatiles, elements and compounds with high boiling points are known as refractory substances.

On the basis of available data, which is sparse for Mars and very uncertain for Venus, the three inner planets then become progressively more depleted in K passing from Mars to Earth to Venus.

== Planetary gamma-ray spectrometers ==
Some elements like potassium, uranium, and thorium are naturally radioactive and give off gamma rays as they decay. Electromagnetic radiation from these isotopes can be detected by a Gamma-Ray Spectrometer (GRS) dropped toward the planetary surface or observed from orbit. An orbiting instrument can map the surface distribution of many elements for an entire planet.

Uncrewed spacecraft programs such as Venera and the Vega program have flown to Venus and sent back data allowing estimates of the K/U ratio of the surface rocks.

The Lunar Prospector mission used a GRS to map the Earth's Moon.

To determine the elemental makeup of the Martian surface, the Mars Odyssey used a GRS and two neutron detectors.

These GRS readings can be compared to direct elemental measurements of chondrites meteorites, Earth, and Moon samples brought back from Apollo program missions, as well as to meteorites that are believed to have come from Mars.

== Ratios of Solar System bodies ==
Solar-System

K and U move together during geochemical processes and have long-lived radioisotopes that emit gamma rays. It is calculated as a ratio of one to the other on an equal mass basis which is often $\mu gram [element]/gram$.

This creates a compelling explanation for the evolution of the Solar System.

Component	K/U ratios
Mercury	Uncertain
Venus	7,000
Earth	12,000
Moon	2,500
Mars	18,000
Ordinary chondrite meteorites	63,000
Carbonaceous chondrite meteorites	70,000

This result is consistent with an increasing temperature toward the Sun during its early protoplanetary nebula phase.

The temperature at the early stage of Solar System formation was in excess of 1,000K at the distance of Earth from the Sun, and as low as 200–100K at the distances of Jupiter and Saturn.

== Earth ==
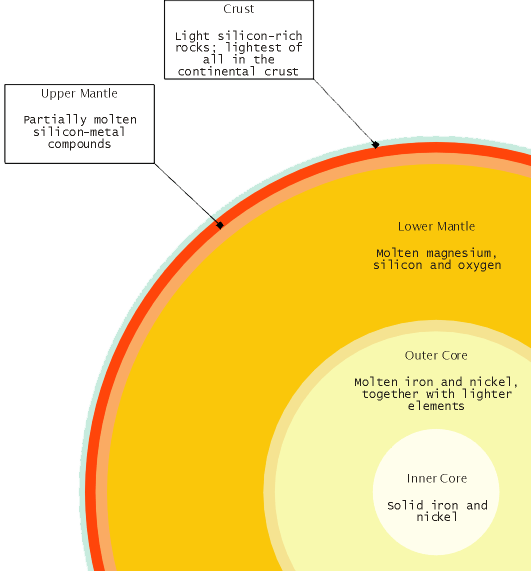
Crust, upper mantle (MORB) and Lower Mantle

At the high temperatures for Earth, no volatiles would be in the solid state, and the dust would be made up of silicate and metal.

The continental crust and lower mantle have average K/U values of about 12,000. mid-ocean ridge basalt (MORB) or upper mantle have more volatiles and have a K/U ratio of about 19,000.

Volatile depletion explains why Earth's sodium (volatile) content is about 10% of its calcium (refractory) content, despite the similar abundance in chondrites.

== Earth's Moon's origin ==
The Moon stands out as being very depleted in volatiles.

The Moon not only lacks water and atmospheric gases, but also lacks moderately volatile elements such as K, Na, and Cl. The Earth's K/U ratio is 12,000, while the Moon has a K/U ratio of only 2,000. This difference suggests that the material that formed the Moon was subjected to temperatures considerably higher than the Earth.

The prevailing theory is that the Moon formed out of the debris left over from a collision between Earth and an astronomical body the size of Mars, approximately 4.5 billion years ago, about 20 to 100 million years after the Solar System coalesced. This is called the Giant-impact hypothesis.

It is hypothesized that most of the outer silicates of the colliding body would be vaporized, whereas a metallic core would not. Hence, most of the collisional material sent into orbit would consist of silicates, leaving the coalescing Moon deficient in iron. The more volatile materials that were emitted during the collision probably would escape the Solar System, whereas silicates would tend to coalesce.

The ratios of the Moon's volatile elements are not explained by the giant-impact hypothesis. If the giant-impact hypothesis is correct, they must be due to some other cause.

== Meteorites ==
Farther from the Sun, the temperature was low enough that volatile elements would precipitate as ices. The two are separated by a snow line controlled by the temperature distribution around the Sun.

Formed farthest from the Sun, the carbonaceous chondrites have the highest K/U ratios. Ordinary chondrites which form closer in are only about 10% depleted in K relative to U.

The fine-grained matrix which fills spaces between the chondrules, however, appears to have formed at rather different temperatures in the various classes of chondrites. For this reason the volatile abundances of different classes of chondrites can vary. One particularly important class is the carbonaceous chondrites because of their high carbon content. In these meteorites, chondrules coexist with minerals that are only stable below 100 °C, so they contain materials that formed in both high- and low-temperature environments and were only later collected together. Further evidence for the primordial attributes of carbonaceous chondrites comes from the fact that they have compositions very similar to the nonvolatile element composition of the Sun.

== Controversy of Mercury ==
Mercury was surveyed by the MESSENGER mission with its Gamma-Ray Spectrometer. The K/U ratios for Mercury could range between 8,000 and 17,000 which would imply a volatile rich planet. However, metal/silicate partitioning data for K and U still needs additional experiments at the conditions of Mercury's core formation to understand this unusual high ratio.
