= Cock Marsh =

Berkshire marshland

- Site of Special Scientific Interest
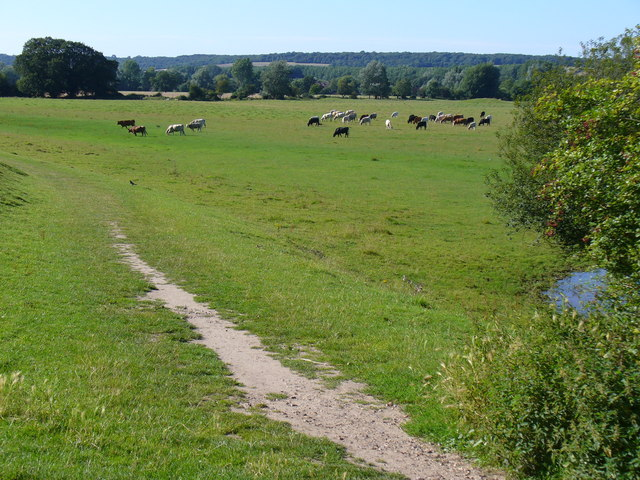
- Location of Cock Marsh.
- Area of search: Berkshire
- Grid reference: SU 882 866
- Coordinates: 51.571°N 0.727°W
- Interest: Biological
- Area: 18.3 hectares (45 acres)
- Notification date: 1983
- Location map: Magic Map

Cock Marsh is an area of marsh land and steep chalk slope covering more than 150-acre (61-hectare) north of Maidenhead in Berkshire. It includes a 45-acre (18-hectare) biological Site of Special Scientific Interest. It is also the location of a Round barrow cemetery and common land where livestock have grazed for hundreds of years. Cock Marsh is owned and managed by the National Trust.

== Description ==
The chalk grasslands of Cock Marsh are located near the River Thames, north of Maidenhead in Berkshire. The site has diverse meadow habitats in a small area, with wet alluvial grassland, calcareous grassland and acidic grassland on clay. It is managed by grazing by horses, cattle and rabbits. There are several ponds and the site is subject to periodic flooding and drying out, which helps to maintain its botanic richness. The marsh is also a locally important birding site.

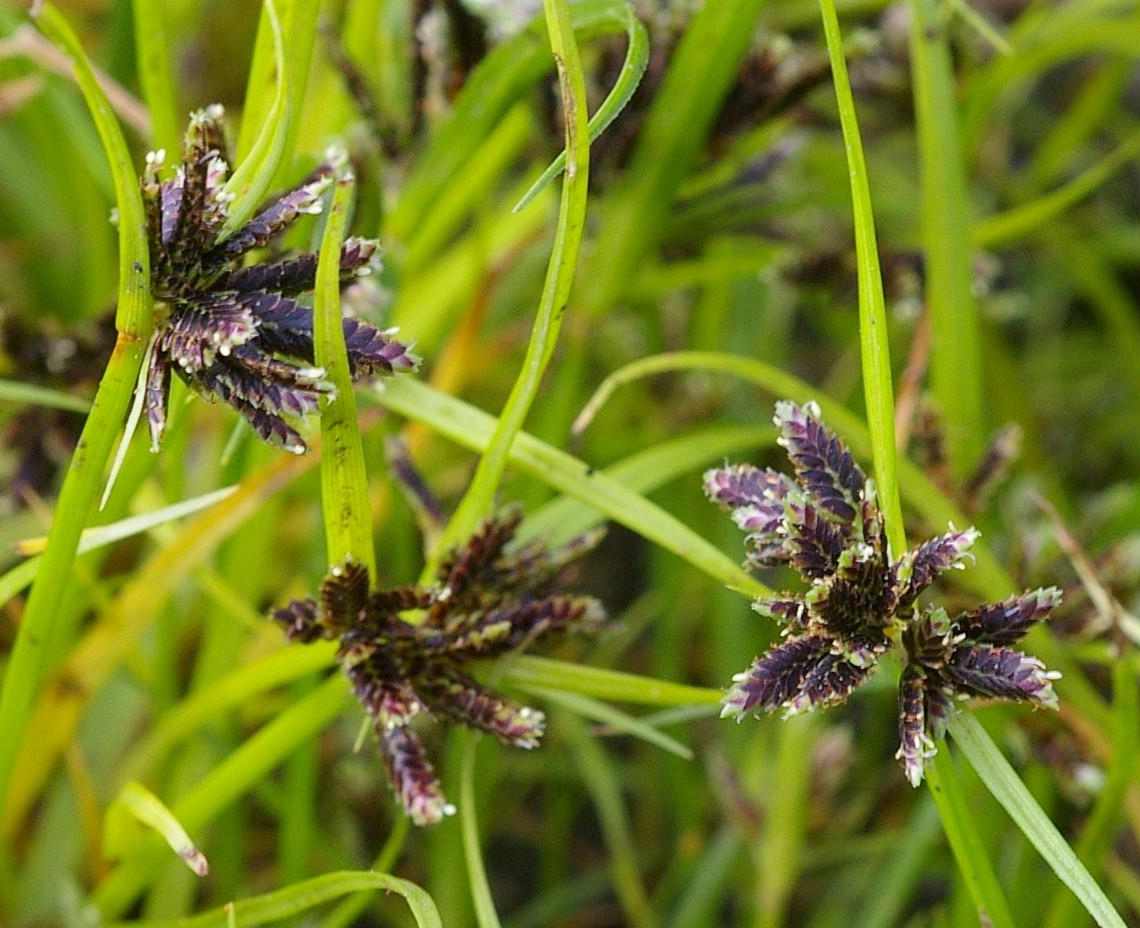
Cyperus Fuscus

The marshy grasslands and ponds support an abundant and diverse plant community. Some of the plants are: Triglochin palustris (marsh arrowgrass), Hottonia palustris (water violets), Polygonum minus (lesser persicaria), Hydrocotyle vulgaris (marsh pennywort), Oenanthe aquatica (water hemlock), and Salix willow scrub. Cyperus fuscus (brown galingale), a rare and endangered species of sedge, thrives in the wet areas at Cock Marsh where grazing animals disturb the ground. The plant is listed on the International Union for Conservation of Nature (IUCN)'s list of near threatened plant species. It is classified as Vulnerable in Britain and protected by Schedule 8 of the Wildlife and Countryside Act 1981.

Cock Marsh is one of the Maidenhead and Cookham Commons which were originally part of the Royal Manor of Cookham. These were sold to a committee from the village for £2,800 and donated to the National Trust in 1937, which now manages them.

== Round barrow cemetery ==
A round barrow cemetery, listed as a scheduled monument, is located at Cock Marsh on the flood plain of the River Thames. The cemetery contains four Bronze Age burial mounds (tumuli) which survive as earthworks. The burial mounds were excavated between 1874 and 1877. The mounds were built in the early Bronze Age and later used as a burial ground by Anglo-Saxons. In the largest mound, the remains of a woman were uncovered along with several remnants from a funeral feast. In one of the smaller barrows, the remains of a small child were discovered. Finds included cremation burials, flint tools, pottery, animal bones, part of a shield and a knife. When initially built, the largest mound had a diameter of 90 and was eight feet high. Today, only the largest mound is discernible.
