= Marlow railway station =

Railway station serving the town of Marlow in Buckinghamshire, England

Marlow
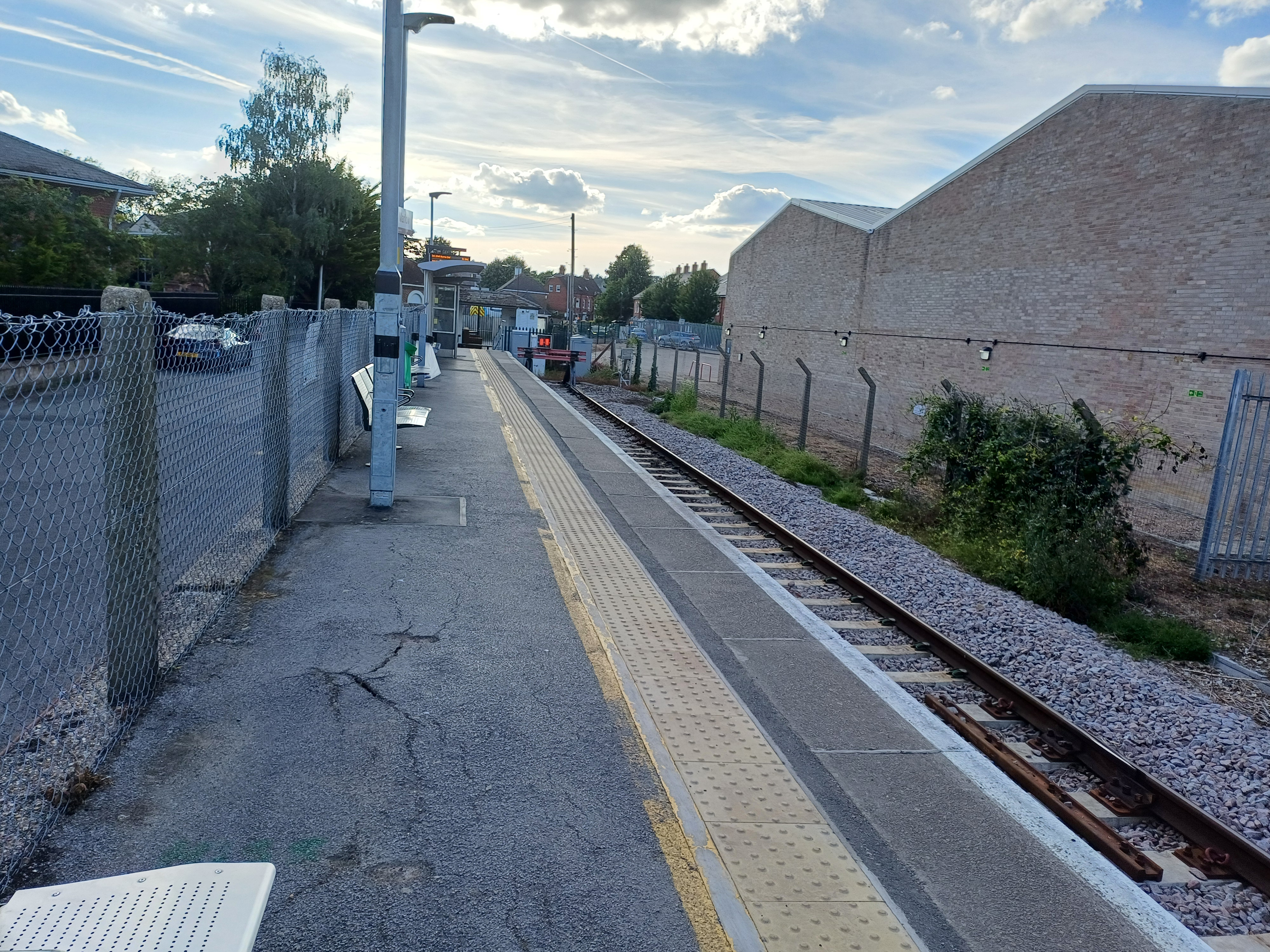
- Looking down towards the buffer stop; one can see an expansion junction to the bottom right of the image

General information
- Location: Marlow, Buckinghamshire; England
- Coordinates: 51.571°N 0.766°W
- Grid reference: SU855865
- Manager: Great Western Railway
- Platforms: 1

Other information
- Station code: MLW
- Classification: DfT category F1

History
- Original company: Great Marlow Railway
- Pre-grouping: Great Western Railway
- Post-grouping: Great Western Railway

Key dates
- 28 June 1873: Opened as "Great Marlow"
- 14 February 1899: Renamed "Marlow"
- 10 July 1967: Station relocated

Passengers
- 2021/22: ▲0.198 million
- 2022/23: ▲0.255 million
- 2023/24: ▲0.312 million
- 2024/25: ▲0.361 million
- 2025/26: ▲0.364 million
Location
Notes
- Passenger statistics from the Office of Rail and Road

Marlow railway station serves the town of Marlow in Buckinghamshire, England. It is 2 miles 54 chains (4.3 km) west of Bourne End and is the terminus of the single-track Marlow branch line from Maidenhead.

== History ==
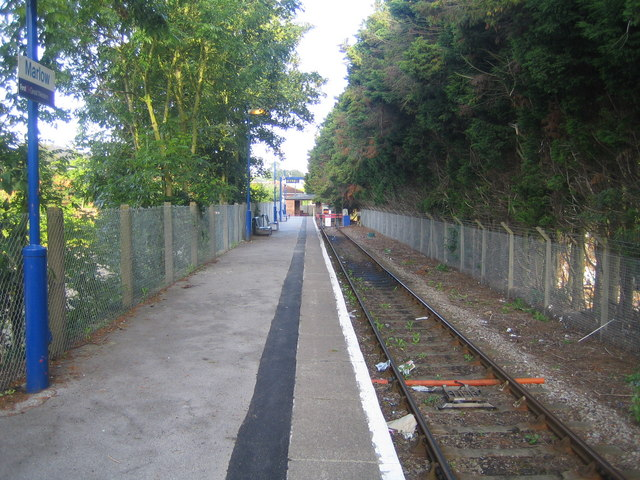
Looking West towards the Buffer Stops

A branch from the Wycombe Railway at Bourne End was built by the Great Marlow Railway; this was opened on 28 June 1873, and was worked by the Great Western Railway. The terminus was originally named Great Marlow. The branch was absorbed by the GWR on 6 August 1897. On 14 February 1899, the station was renamed "Marlow".

There was a proposal to extend the branch westwards to Henley-on-Thames, but the plan was met with local opposition.

British Rail opened the present station on 10 July 1967 on the site of the goods yard of the original station. The original station was then closed, demolished and its site redeveloped.

The line was originally a branch from the Wycombe Railway route between Maidenhead and High Wycombe. When this service was withdrawn north of Bourne End in 1970, Marlow station became the terminus of the Marlow Branch Line which leaves the main Great Western Main Line at Maidenhead.

The service on the branch line is known locally as the "Marlow Donkey", which is commemorated by a local pub of the same name, although the origin of the term is unclear.

== Services ==
Services are provided by Great Western Railway; at peak times these shuttle between Marlow and Bourne End every 30 minutes, but off-peak and at weekends they run through to Maidenhead once per hour, reversing at Bourne End. The trip typically takes 23 minutes.

Preceding station	National Rail	Following station
Bourne End	Great Western Railway; Marlow Branch Line	Terminus
