= Newbury Racecourse railway station =

Railway station in the town of Newbury, Berkshire, England

Newbury Racecourse
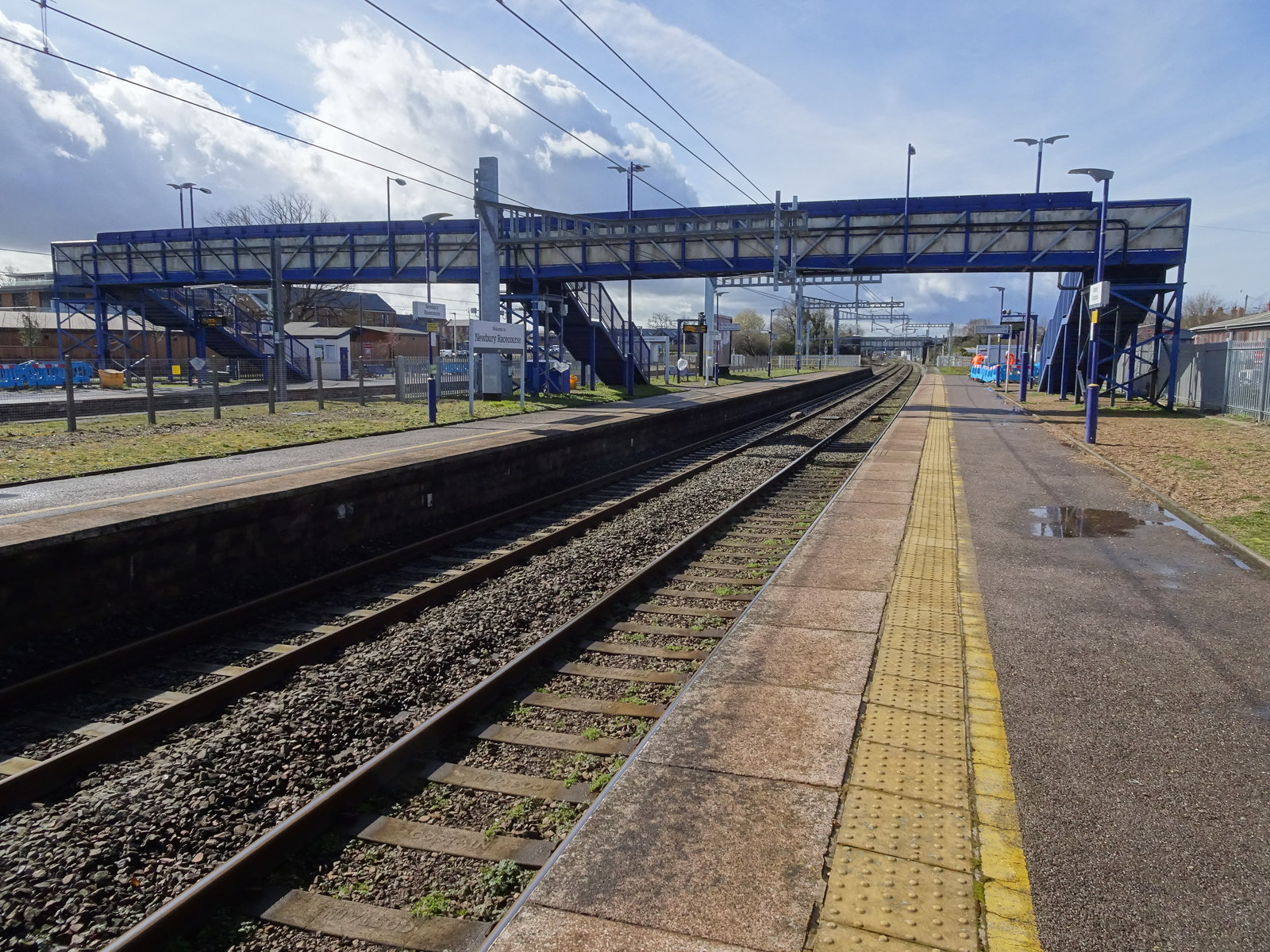
- Station following electrification

General information
- Location: East Fields, Newbury, West Berkshire; England
- Coordinates: 51.398°N 1.308°W
- Grid reference: SU482668
- Managed by: Great Western Railway
- Platforms: 3

Other information
- Station code: NRC
- Classification: DfT category F1

History
- Opened: 26 September 1905
- Original company: Great Western Railway

Passengers
- 2020/21: ▼17,890
- 2021/22: ▲73,204
- 2022/23: ▲83,728
- 2023/24: ▲99,044
- 2024/25: ▲0.115 million
Location
Notes
- Passenger statistics from the Office of Rail and Road

Newbury Racecourse railway station serves the East Fields area of the town of Newbury, Berkshire, England, and the adjacent Newbury Racecourse. It is 52 miles 31 chains (52.39 miles, 84.31 km) measured from London Paddington. It was opened on 26 September 1905.

As the station is next to the racecourse it handles heavy traffic and additional trains on race days. Otherwise, the station is served by local services operated by Great Western Railway between Reading and Newbury.

== Services ==
Newbury Racecourse station is served by local services operated by Great Western Railway between Reading and Newbury. A very limited number of trains also serve Bedwyn.

Services are summarised as follows.

Preceding station	National Rail	Following station
Thatcham	Great Western Railway; Reading - Newbury	Newbury

During race meets or large events at Newbury Racecourse additional trains serve the station. They include a shuttle service to Reading and an extra stop for services that do not normally call at the station. During some races, a special charter calls at the station. The special trains and the shuttle service usually use the third platform on the south side of the station.

== History ==
The Great Western Railway opened the station on 26 September 1905, several decades after the rest of the stations on this part of the line. It was used for race specials only. It did not even appear on timetables until 1912 but even then, it was still used only for race traffic.

In 1990, after the building of new facilities at the racecourse and the building of a new industrial estate on Hambridge Road, a regular stopping service was introduced for the station.

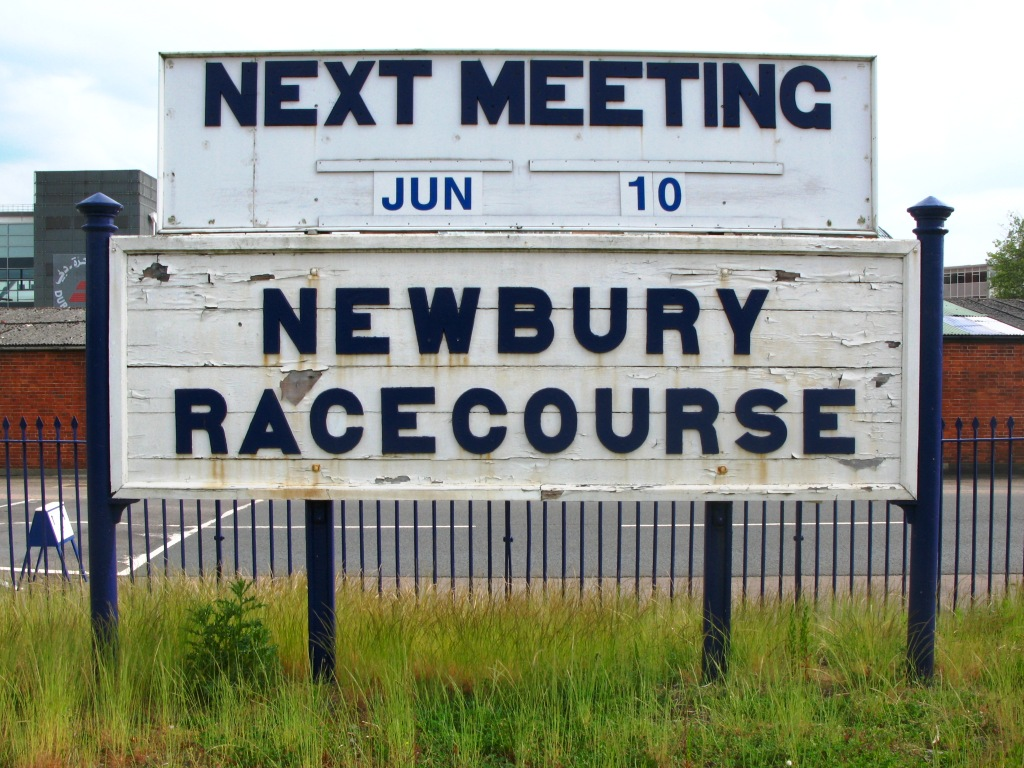
An old GWR sign, still in use in 2010

The station originally had four platforms. The additional platform was on the south-facing side of what is now platform two. The platform on the south side also included station buildings and a roof through which passengers passed to access the racecourse. There was also a turntable at the station used for turning steam locomotives that had brought specials at the start of the race day so they could make the return journey.

=== Service history ===
The station was part of the GWR until railway nationalisation in 1948. After the sectorisation of British Rail in 1982, the station became part of Network SouthEast. Thames Trains provided services from 1996 until it became part of First Great Western Link in 2004 and First Great Western in 2006.

In January 2021 GWR announced a temporary timetable change, in effect from February, which would mean an additional 17 trains stopped at Newbury Racecourse station daily. This was intended to make it easier to travel to the COVID-19 vaccination centre at Newbury Racecourse.

== Current layout ==
The station now has three platforms, two of which are next to the main line. The third platform is on the southern side of the station on a loop. The loop that previously served the fourth platform has now been lifted.

The two main platforms that are currently served by stopping services have been shortened by fencing off the unused parts of the platform. Only short Class 166 DMUs and Class 165 DMUs use these platforms so maintaining their full length is unnecessary. Longer trains can use the third platform.

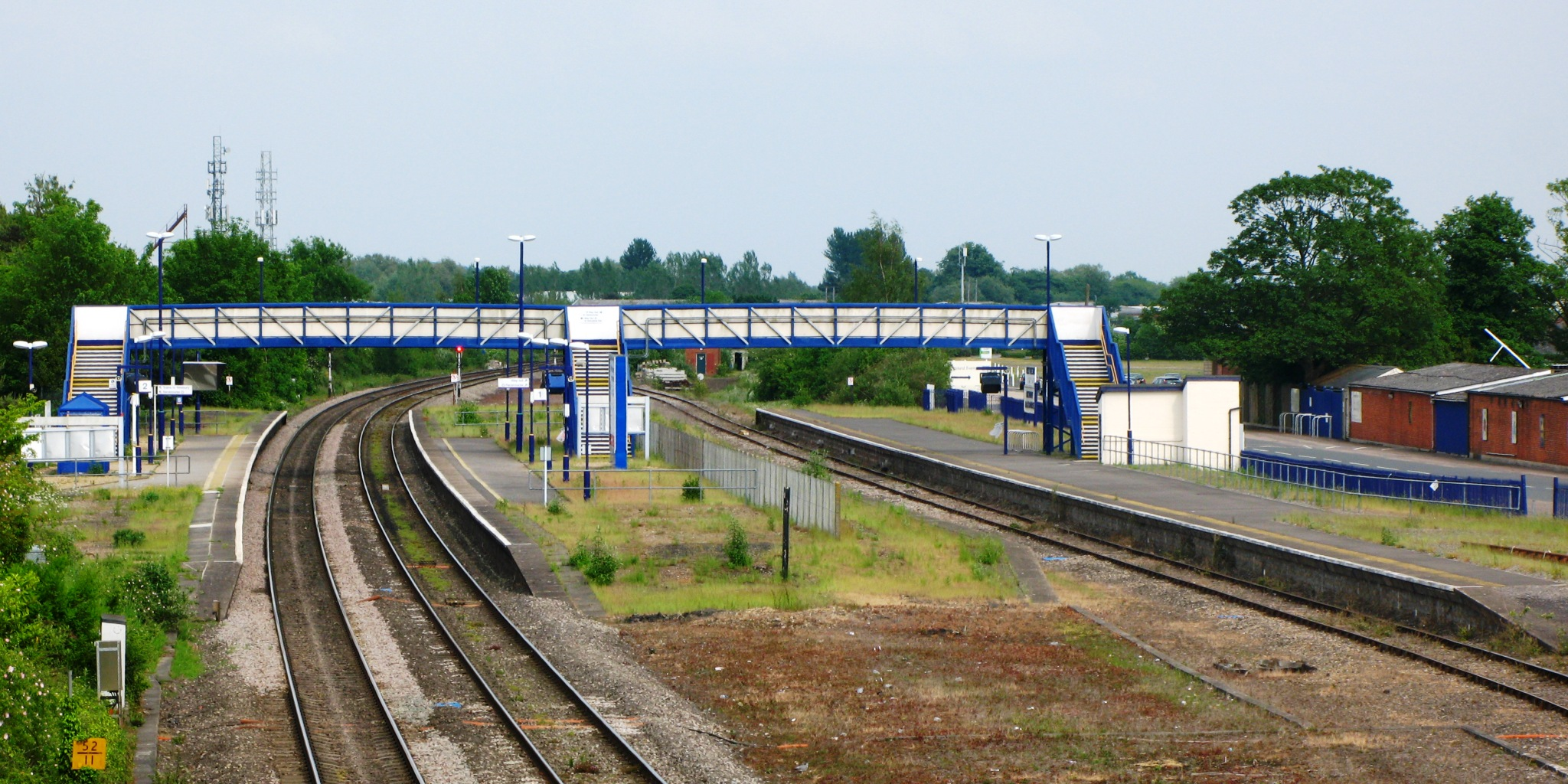
Platform layout (2010)

A footbridge links all the existing platforms. There is a car park on the north side of the station with access to Hambridge Road. The car park on the south side of the station is on the property of Newbury Racecourse.

Freight trains use the existing loop to allow passenger trains to pass them on the main line. Steam locomotives on special charters that are not stopping in the station also use the loop as a water stop because nearby road access can allow a water tender to reach the line. It also prevents such trains from blocking the main line or a platform at Newbury. All continuing trains using the loop at the racecourse must also travel through the loop on the down platform at Newbury to rejoin the main line.
