= Speen =

Speen may refer to:

- Speen, Buckinghamshire, United Kingdom
- Speen, Berkshire, United Kingdom
  - Speen railway station
