= Thatcham =

Market town in Berkshire, England

Coordinates: 51°24′18″N 1°15′50″W

- Market town and civil parish
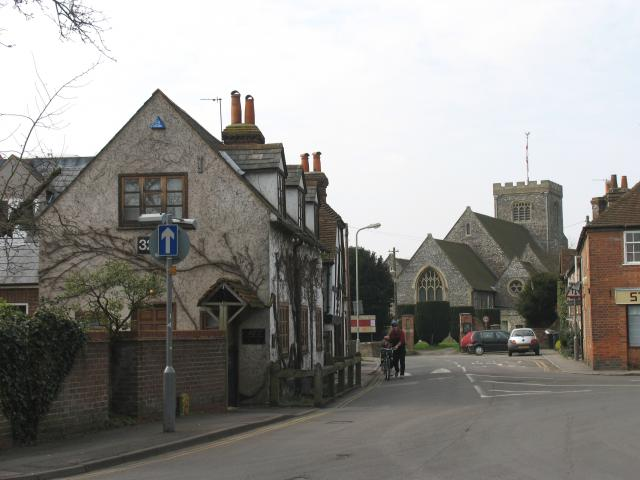
- Thatcham town centre

- Location within Berkshire
- Area: 21.76 km^{2} (8.40 sq mi)
- Population: 25,464 (2021 Census)
  - Density: 1,170/km^{2} (3,000/sq mi)
- OS grid reference: SU5167
- Civil parish: Thatcham
- Unitary authority: West Berkshire
- Ceremonial county: Berkshire
- Region: South East
- Country: England
- Sovereign state: United Kingdom
- Post town: THATCHAM
- Postcode district: RG18, RG19
- Dialling code: 01635
- Police: Thames Valley
- Fire: Royal Berkshire
- Ambulance: South Central
- UK Parliament: Newbury

Thatcham is a market town and civil parish in West Berkshire, England. It is situated in the valley of the River Kennet 3 miles (4.8 km) east of Newbury, 14 miles (23 km) west of Reading and 54 miles (87 km) west of London. The town has a long history dating back to prehistoric times, a claimant to the title of oldest continuously inhabited place in Great Britain. As of 2021, it had a population of 25,464, though it is part of a built-up area comprising itself and neighbouring Newbury of over 70,000 residents. It is on the route of the A4 Bath Road, the historic main road between London and Bristol.

== Geography ==
Thatcham straddles the River Kennet, the Kennet and Avon Canal and the A4. The parish currently covers the town of Thatcham, with its suburb of Dunstan Park and the villages of Crookham, Henwick and Colthrop including Crookham Common and the eastern ranges of the old RAF Greenham Common airfield. The historic parish once also covered Midgham, Cold Ash, Ashmore Green and Greenham. Thatcham Reed Beds, just to the south of the town, is a site of Special Scientific Interest (SSSI).

== Toponymy ==
The name may have been derived from that of a Saxon chief called Tace (or perhaps Tac or Tec), who established a village in around 500 AD. The settlement might have been known as Taceham - ham meaning village in Saxon. However, some of the earliest written references, in c.951 and c.975, records it as Thaecham. The Thaec comes from the Saxon þæc or thaec meaning roof-covering and the ham has been speculated to be a shortened hamm which would mean a river meadow. In Domesday Book of 1086, following the Norman Conquest, the name had altered slightly to Taceham before going through several minor changes until the current form was adopted in the 16th century.

== History ==
The area has evidence of occupation dating from prehistoric times and was listed in the Guinness Book of Records as the strongest claimant to being the oldest continuously inhabited place in Britain. The well-preserved remains of a Mesolithic settlement, dating from 8400 to 7700 BCE, have been found in its vicinity. Evidence also exists of Bronze and Iron Age settlements and of Romano-British activity.

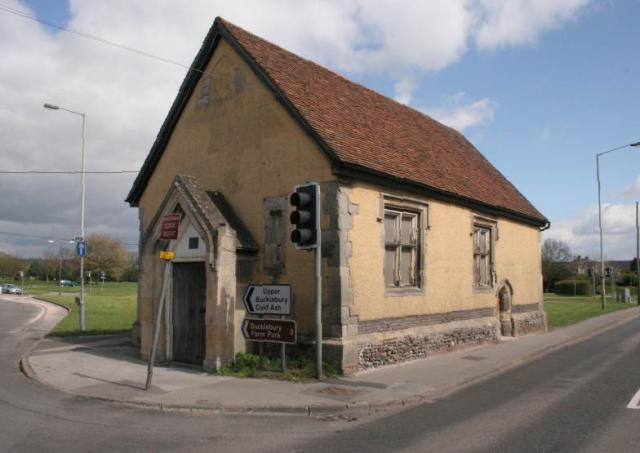
Chapel of St. Thomas the Martyr, erected around 1304

The town had a period of great prosperity around 1304, when the Chapel of St. Thomas the Martyr on the A4, now called the Old Bluecoat School, was granted permission to hold services. At that time the population was larger than that of Newbury. The chapel is a Grade I listed building.

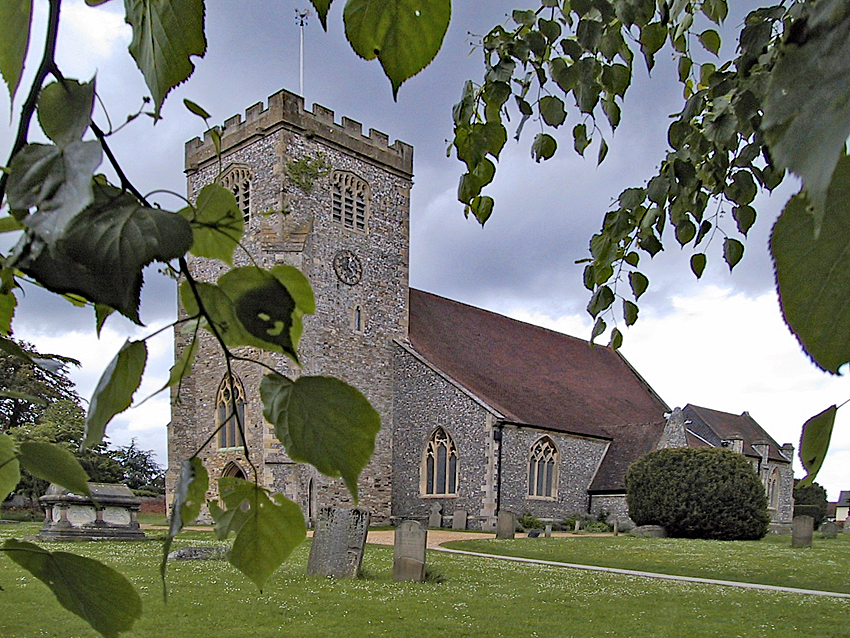
St Mary's church

There is a Norman parish church of St. Mary, which was largely reconstructed in 1857. This is believed to be built on the same site as an earlier Anglo-Saxon church. It was previously known as St. Luke's. The church is a Grade II* listed building.

In 1121, Henry I founded Reading Abbey and endowed it with many gifts of land, including the Manor of Thatcham. At the same time Thatcham Hundred ceased to exist: the western part was transferred to Faircross Hundred, and the remainder to the Hundred of Reading. In 1141 Thatcham church, previously the property of the Diocese of Salisbury, was granted to Reading Abbey by the Empress Matilda, who at the same time confirmed her father's gift of the manor to the abbey.

During World War II, Thatcham housed one of the biggest Prisoner of War camps in the South, known as camp 1001. Thatcham's population grew rapidly in the second half of the 20th century: from 5,000 in 1951 and 7,500 in 1961 to 22,824 in 2001.

=== Floods ===
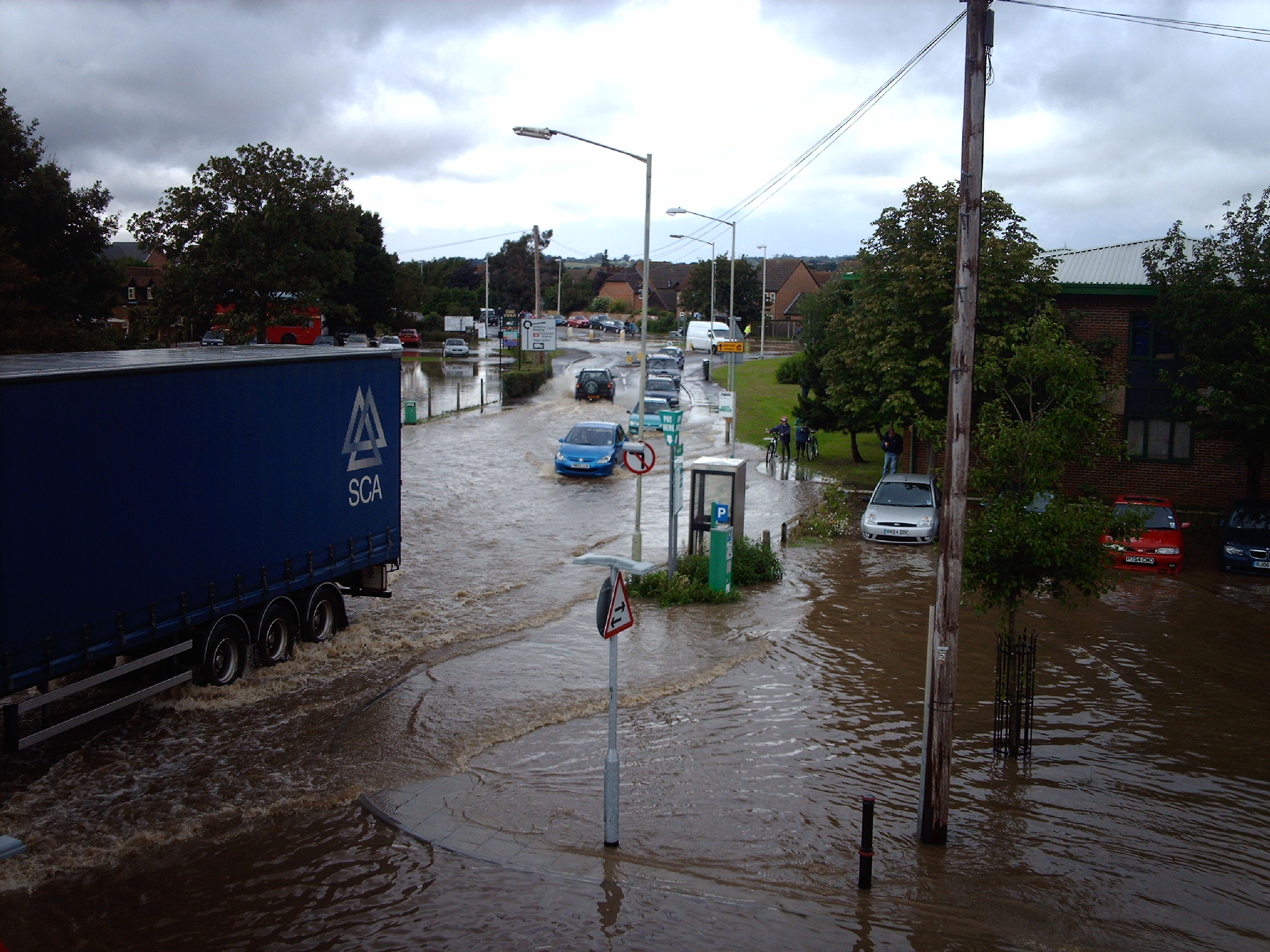
Station Road during flooding

On 20 July 2007, parts of Thatcham were flooded during a period of sustained heavy rain, during which three times the average July monthly rainfall hit the town in just 24 hours. While the rivers did not flood, the quantity of water flowing down the hills from Cold Ash and Bucklebury made many roads impassable and stranded hundreds of pupils at Kennet School who tried to wade with rope across Stoney Lane. About 1,100 properties were affected; many residents moved out into mobile homes.

== Institutions ==
=== Schools ===
Although there are many primary schools in the area, the only secondary school in Thatcham is the Kennet School.

=== Motor Insurers' Automotive Research Centre ===
The motor insurers' automotive research centre is located at Colthrop. The 'Thatcham categories' issued there are the industry standard for vehicle immobilisers and alarms.

=== International Seismological Centre ===
The International Seismological Centre, an organisation for the final collection, definitive analysis and publication of global seismicity, is located in Pipers Lane, Thatcham.

== Transport ==
Thatcham railway station is on the Reading to Taunton line, with regular services between Reading and Newbury and between Paddington and Bedwyn, operated by Great Western Railway. The main east–west road through the town is the A4 Bath Road, which runs between London and Bristol. This road has been superseded as a long-distance route by the M4 motorway which runs almost parallel to the A4, about 3 miles (4.8 km) to the north. The closest junction to the town is the Chieveley interchange at Junction 13.

== Sports and leisure ==
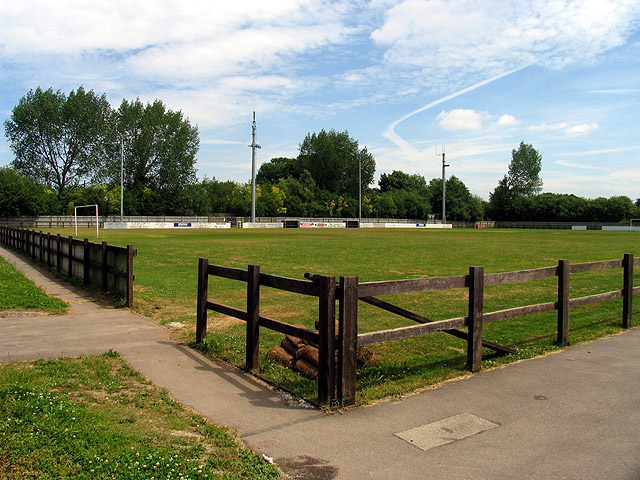
Waterside Park, the home of Thatcham Town

Thatcham is home to non-league football club Thatcham Town, who play their matches at Waterside Park, 300 metres (330 yd) south of the Thatcham railway station. The club won the FA Vase in the 2017–18 season, becoming the first Berkshire side to reach a national football cup final. Thatcham Town Cricket Club play in the Thames Valley Cricket League with its main ground based on Brownsfield Road, next to the town council offices. The Henwick Worthy Sports Ground is the home of the Newbury and Thatcham Hockey Club and the Thatcham Rugby Union Football Club, and plays host to a number of amateur and youth sports.

== Governance ==
The town is divided into four wards for West Berkshire Council elections: Thatcham Central, Thatcham North, Thatcham South & Crookham and Thatcham West. Seven councillors represent Thatcham on the West Berkshire Council with the Liberal Democrats having seven councillors. These wards are used in town council elections, with eighteen Liberal Democrats sitting on the town council. At national level it is represented, since 2024, by the Liberal Democrat MP for Newbury, Lee Dillon.

=== Town twinning ===
Thatcham is twinned with Nideggen, North Rhine-Westphalia, Germany.

== Demography ==
Local employment is chiefly in light industrial premises, sales and distribution, retail and public sectors.

2011 Published Statistics: Population, home ownership and extracts from Physical Environment, surveyed in 2005
Output area	Homes owned outright	Owned with a loan	Socially rented	Privately rented	Other	km^{2} roads	km^{2} water	km^{2} domestic gardens	Usual residents	km^{2}
Civil parish	2,640	4,629	1,439	1,160	65	0.871	0.676	2.323	25,267	21.78

== See also ==
- HMS Thatcham, a Ham class minesweeper
