= Colthrop =

Coordinates: 51°24′13″N 1°13′31″W

- Hamlet
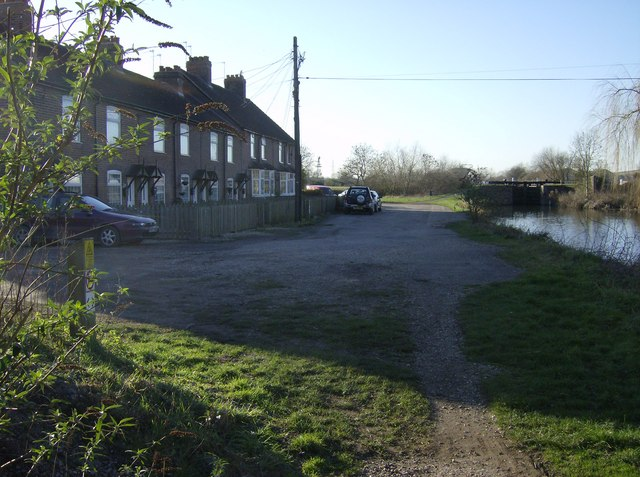
- Cottages at Colthrop

- Location within Berkshire
- OS grid reference: SU542668
- Metropolitan borough: West Berkshire
- Metropolitan county: Berkshire
- Region: South East
- Country: England
- Sovereign state: United Kingdom
- Post town: Thatcham
- Postcode district: RG19
- Dialling code: 01635
- Police: Thames Valley
- Fire: Royal Berkshire
- Ambulance: South Central
- UK Parliament: Berkshire

Colthrop is a hamlet near the town of Thatcham in the English county of Berkshire, England.

== Geography ==
Colthrop is part of the civil parish of Thatcham. The settlement lies on the A4 road, and is the location of numerous industrial parks and haulage depots due to the area's proximity to Thatcham railway station. The industrial area was previously the site of the Colthrop paper mills.

== Motor Insurers' Automotive Research Centre ==
The motor insurers’ automotive research centre was established by the UK motor insurance industry in 1969. Its aim is to reduce or contain the cost of motor insurance claims in the UK whilst maintaining safety standards. It is based at Colthrop in Thatcham. The 'Thatcham categories' issued by the centre for vehicle immobilisers and alarms have become an industry standard since their launch in the 1990s.
