= Newbury railway station =

Railway station in Berkshire, England

Newbury
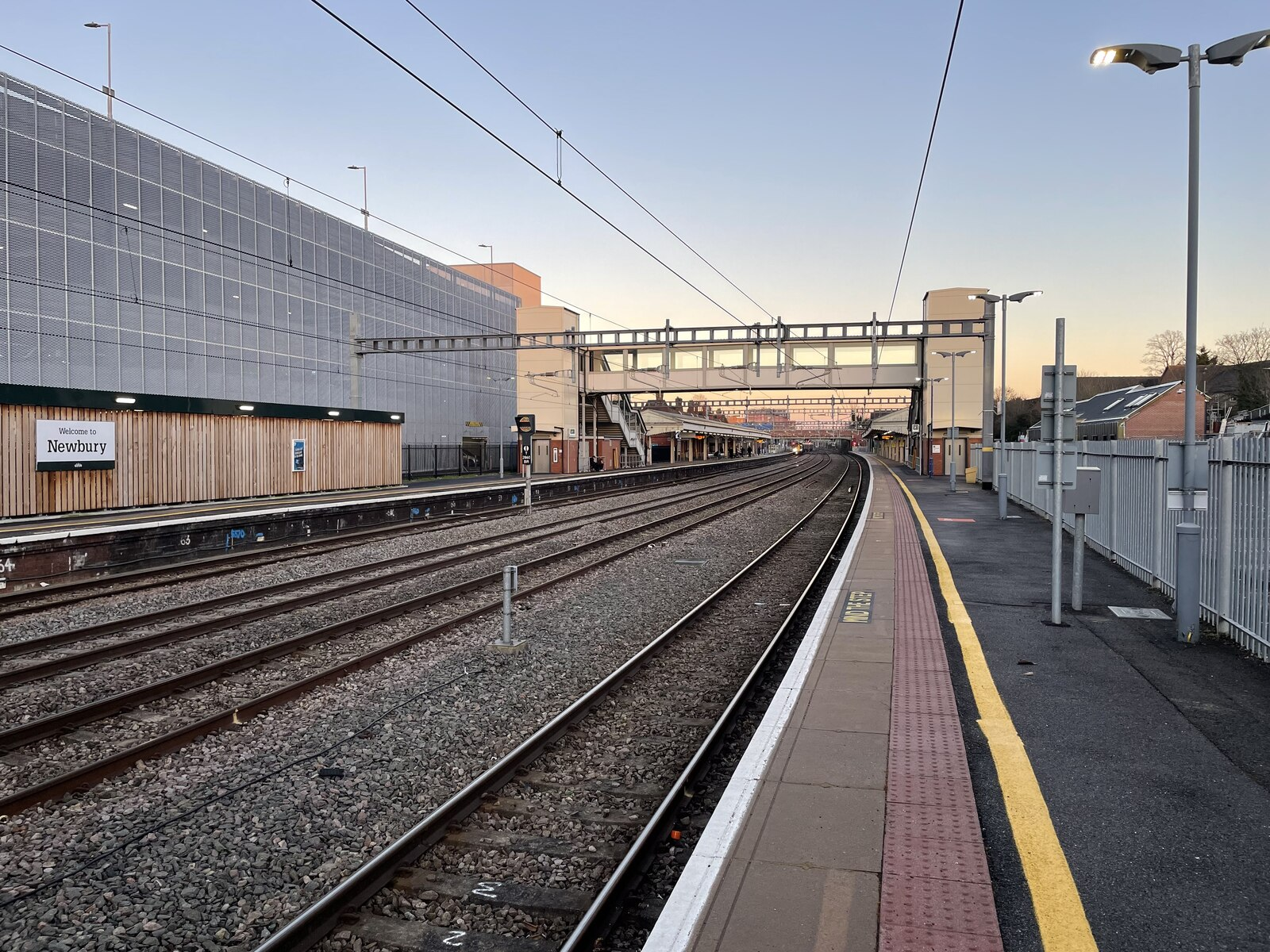
- The station following electrification, showing new footbridge, overhead wires and multi-storey car park (2023)

General information
- Location: Newbury, West Berkshire; England
- Coordinates: 51.398°N 1.323°W
- Grid reference: SU471667
- Manager: Great Western Railway
- Platforms: 3
- Tracks: 5

Other information
- Station code: NBY
- Classification: DfT category C1

History
- Original company: Berks and Hants Railway
- Pre-grouping: Great Western Railway
- Post-grouping: Great Western Railway

Key dates
- 21 December 1847: Opened
- 1881: DN&SR opened
- 1885: DN&SR Winchester opened
- 1898: LVR opened
- 1908–1910: Rebuilt
- 4 January 1960: LVR closed
- May 1964: DN&SR closed

Passengers
- 2021/22: ▲0.998 million
- Interchange: ▲20,844
- 2022/23: ▲1.208 million
- Interchange: ▲0.112 million
- 2023/24: ▲1.380 million
- Interchange: ▲0.115 million
- 2024/25: ▲1.539 million
- Interchange: ▲0.131 million
- 2025/26: ▲1.675 million
- Interchange: ▲0.138 million
Location
Notes
- Passenger statistics from the Office of Rail and Road

Newbury railway station is located in the centre of the market town of Newbury, in Berkshire, England. The station lies 53 miles 6 chains (53.08 mi; 85.4 km) from London Paddington. It is served by stopping services between Reading and Newbury and Bedwyn, and by faster services between London Paddington, Exeter St Davids and other parts of Devon and Cornwall. All services are operated by Great Western Railway.

The station was formerly a junction with both the north–south Didcot, Newbury and Southampton Railway and for the Lambourn Valley Railway.

== History ==
=== Line opening ===
Newbury station was opened on 21 December 1847 as part of the Berks and Hants Railway from Reading to Hungerford. Newbury was an important junction on the Didcot, Newbury and Southampton Railway (DN&SR), the first section of which opened between Didcot and Newbury in 1881. The route to Winchester was then opened in 1885 but it was not until 1891 that a route to Southampton was completed. However, the route did not include the planned independent Southampton terminus and instead used the terminus owned by the London and South Western Railway.

In 1898, the Lambourn Valley Railway (LVR) was opened which ran from the west of the station to Lambourn, north-west of Newbury. Trains to Lambourn started from the bay on the north platform at its western end.

=== Station expansion ===
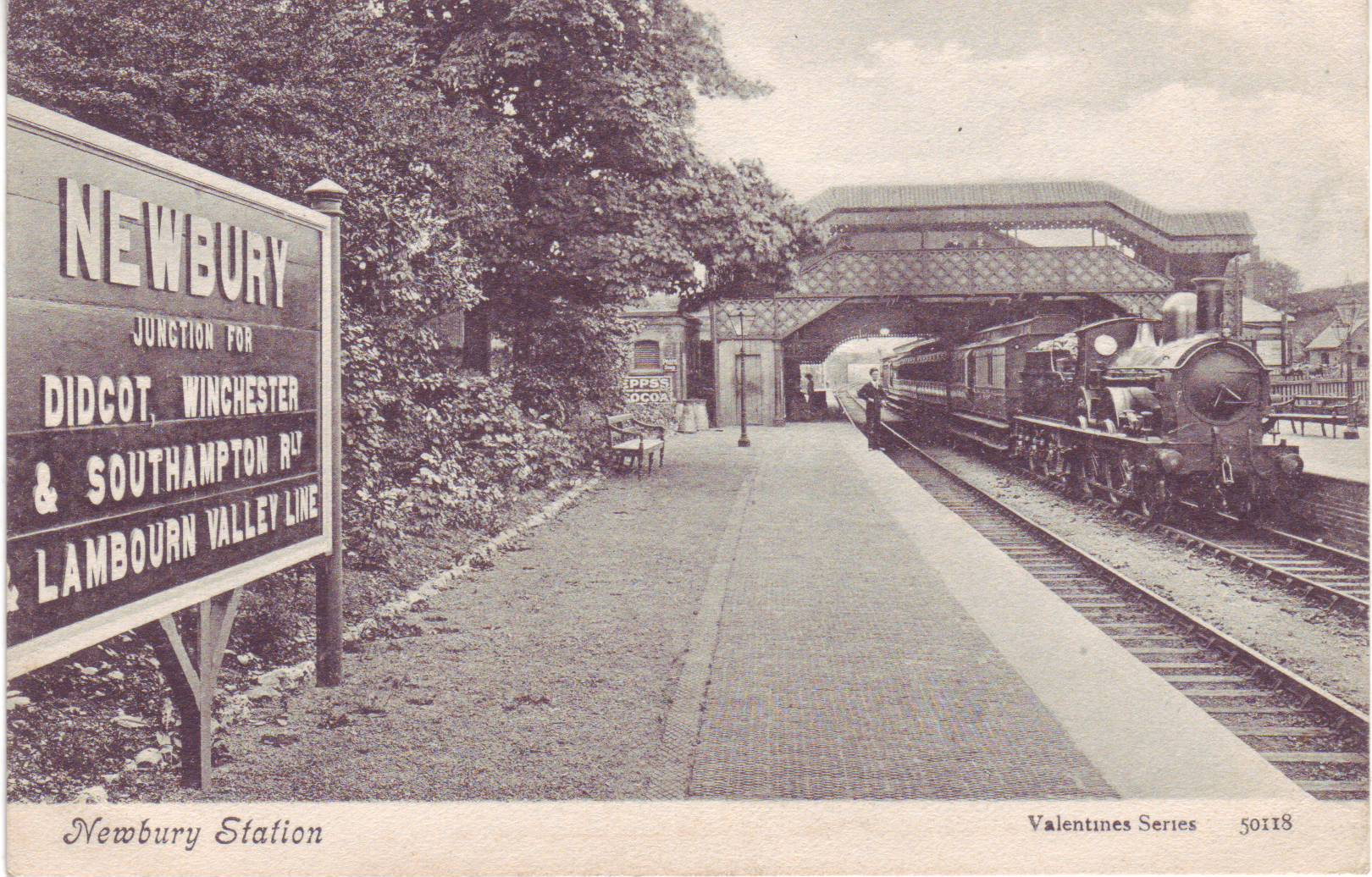
Newbury in the early twentieth century

By 1890, Newbury was an important station and junction. There were two lines through the station covered by an overall roof, plus a footbridge, turntable, goods yard and two bay platforms. However, the expansion of the DN&SR and the later opening of the LVR created a bottleneck in Newbury, especially for express trains on the Reading to Plymouth line.

Between 1908 and 1910, the station was rebuilt to extend the platforms and create two loops to ensure trains stopping at the station did not block the line for express and freight trains. Red brick was used for the new station buildings which are still in use today. A new footbridge was built across the station.

The expansion also included the building of two signal boxes, one at each end of the station. It was possible to hear the bells in these boxes ringing from a point mid-way along the main platforms. Access to the yard became possible from the down and up through lines and the main up (north) platform.

=== Line closures ===
The 1960s saw the closure of both the DN&SR and the LVR due to declining passenger and freight traffic on both lines. Regular local services southwards to Winchester ended in March 1960 and those northwards to Didcot in September 1962. The last passenger train to use the DN&SR ran in May 1964, a rerouted express train resulting from a derailment at Reading West. The tracks were lifted in 1967.

British Railways (BR) withdrew LVR passenger services on 4 January 1960, but freight services continued to serve RAF Welford into the 1970s. When the United States Air Force decided it no longer needed to use the rail link, it handed control back to BR in 1973. One last passenger special operated on the line in November of that year before the line was totally closed and the track was later lifted.

As a result of the closure of the LVR the bay platform on the north side at the western end of the station was no longer needed and the track was removed. The bay on the south side remained in use into the 1970s for recessing local trains to Bedwyn until a down express had passed; the local train would reverse into the bay, to leave the main down platform free for an express to call, thus allowing passengers disembarking from the express to board the local train for onward travel towards Bedwyn. The south bay was later removed when the station was resignalled and the track layout altered to allow down expresses to serve the north side platform. Both west end bays are now car parks. The sole east end bay on the north side of the line is maintained for use for eastbound passenger services starting at Newbury. Locally it is still called the "Compton Bay" because of its original purpose on the DN&SR.

=== Electrification and modernisation ===
In December 2018, Newbury became the western limit of electrification from Reading, as part of the Great Western electrification scheme. To prepare the station for electrification, it was announced that the station would benefit from a £6 million upgrade to improve connections for pedestrians and public transport users. A new footbridge was completed in May 2018 allowing disabled access across the platforms, replacing the old footbridge which was dismantled in June 2018 after nearly 110 years of service. Electrical wire gantries have also been erected over the station canopies, which were cut back for the removal of the footbridge.

=== Service history ===
The station was part of the Great Western Railway until Britain's railways were nationalised in 1948. After the sectorisation of British Rail in 1982, the station became part of Network SouthEast and was also a stop on the InterCity network. From 1996 until 2004, services were provided by Thames Trains and, from 2004 to 2006, services were provided by First Great Western Link. Since 2006, services have been provided by Great Western Railway, which rebranded from First Great Western.

== Layout ==
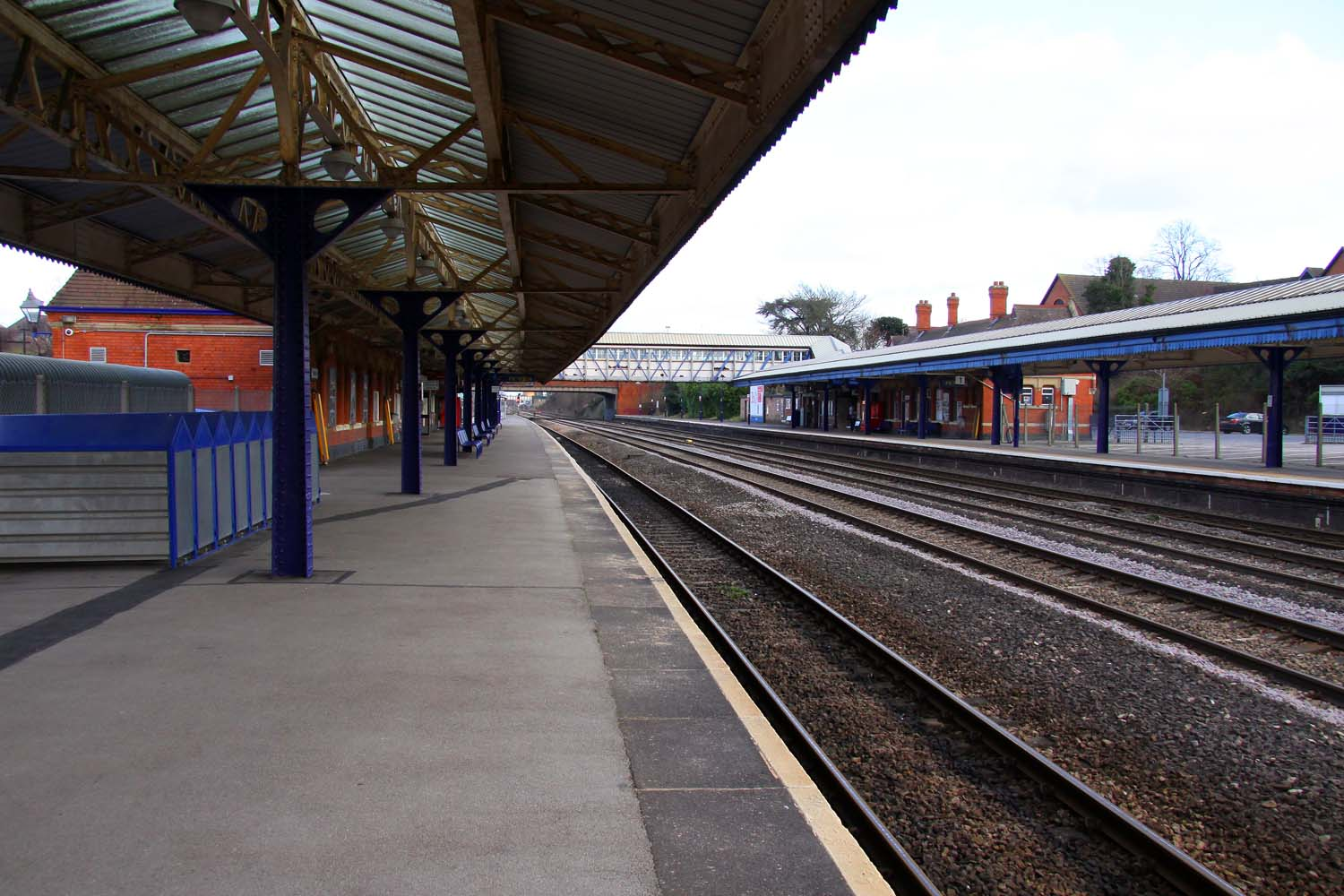
The station looking to the east

The current station has two through platforms, both on loops off the main line, leaving two through tracks running through the middle of the station. There is also a bay platform on the north east side for short trains to and from Reading. These parts of the station layout have all survived from the expansion of the station in 1908. The platform access was converted to entry by ticket through automatic barriers early in 2013.

The northbound up platform has provision for trains to call in either direction. This facility is not frequently used in the current timetable except during periods of severe line congestion to avoid delays, however, it was not uncommon for Down trains to call on this platform in the past. The signalling also allows for the station to continue operating when the southbound platform is closed for any reason.

To the east of the station there is a siding on the up line. It is still commonly used for storing engineering units. Local services sometimes use it to allow passengers wishing to travel to intervening stations to connect from inter-city services.

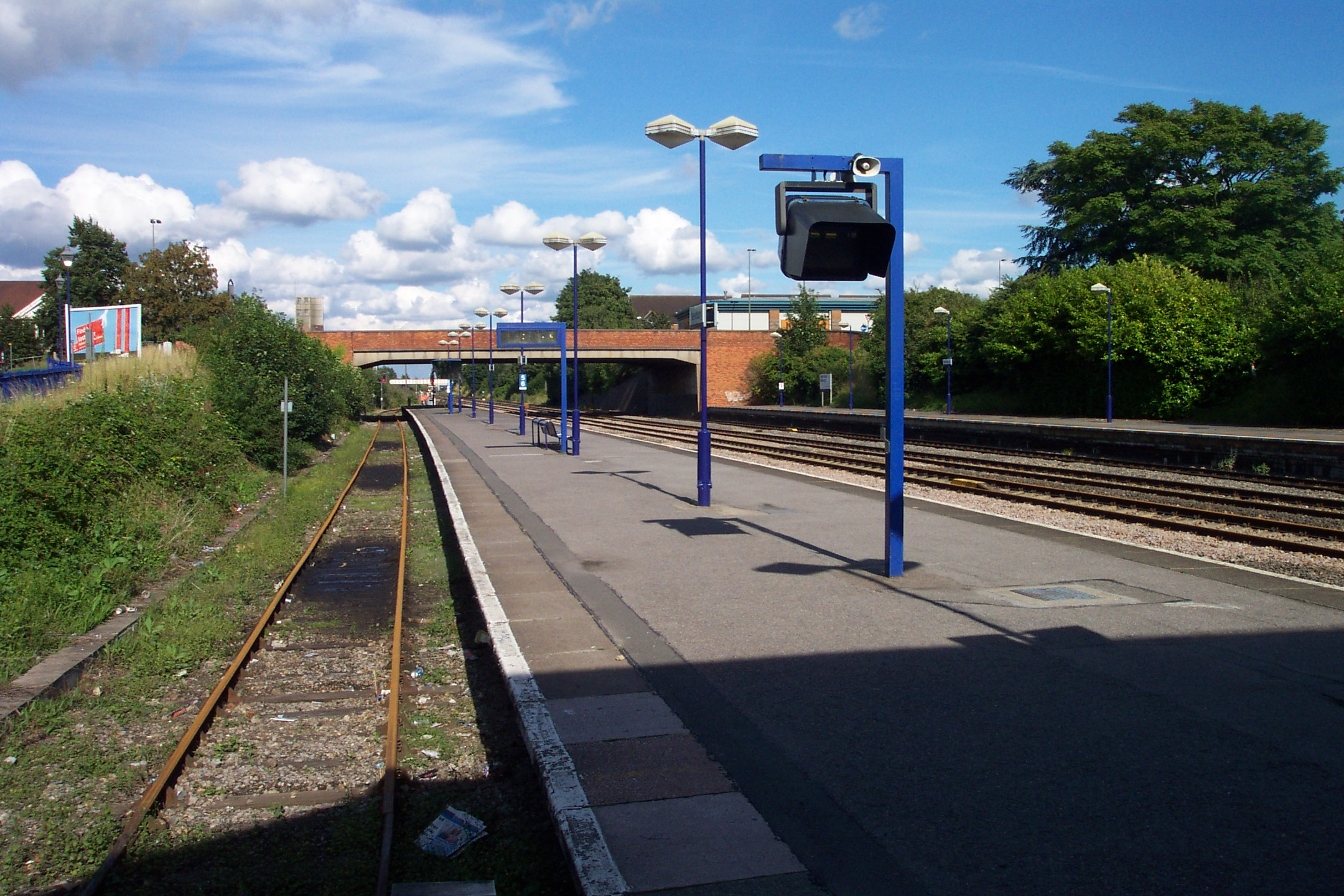
The station looking to the east, with the "Compton bay" platform to the left

Also to the east of the station, on the Down line is a loop which also runs through Newbury Racecourse which is used regularly as a passing point by freight trains and also by local services in the same way as the sidings on the north side. This loop is also used by local services calling at Newbury Racecourse during race days. Special chartered trains hauled by steam locomotives often use the loop to take on water because it has good road access although the down platform in Newbury station can also be used for this purpose. All trains that pass through the loop must continue through the loop for the down platform to rejoin the main line.

The station is now signalled with colour light signals controlled from Thames Valley Signalling Centre in Didcot.

== Facilities ==
The station's facilities include a staffed ticket office open on weekdays and weekends; car parks on both sides of the station; covered bicycle storage; taxi rank; toilets and a shop on Platform 2 and waiting rooms on both main platforms.

In June 2021, Great Western Railway submitted plans for a redevelopment of the station, that would see the ticket gates brought inside, new business units, a new multistorey car park and a second bicycle parking station.

== Services ==
Great Western Railway operates an hourly (Mon-Sat) semi-fast service between London Paddington and here, along with a local stopping service between here and Reading, (also hourly) calling at all intermediate stations. There is also an hourly service between here and Bedwyn, calling at all stations; long-distance services between London Paddington and Exeter St Davids call every two hours, with certain services extended to reach Paignton, Plymouth and Penzance.

Services at the station were disrupted throughout 2021 due to cracks found in the Intercity Express Trains, causing the loss of the regular direct service from Bedwyn to London. Since 2021, there has been a diesel shuttle to Bedwyn; 5 years later, despite the cracks being resolved and continued complaints, this service is still in operation. Rail magazine reported GWR's position on the matter, saying

The [Bedwyn Trains] passenger group has been in regular contact with GWR, which has told customers it does not know when regular Bedwyn [to London] services might be restored. The operator has said it would not be possible to restore even one of the train sets used on the route, which would enable one third of through services. It also told the passenger group that it would not be possible for trains serving nearby Pewsey to make additional stops.

Preceding station	National Rail	Following station
Reading	Great Western Railway; Reading–Taunton line	Hungerford
Reading	Great Western Railway; Reading–Taunton line	Pewsey
Reading	Great Western Railway; Reading–Taunton line	Taunton
Thatcham	Great Western Railway; Reading–Taunton line	Kintbury
Newbury Racecourse	Great Western Railway; Reading–Taunton line	Terminus
	Disused railways	
Hermitage; Line and station closed	Great Western Railway; Didcot, Newbury and Southampton Railway	Woodhay; Line and station closed
Terminus	Great Western Railway; Lambourn Valley Railway	Newbury West Fields Halt; Line and station closed
