= Thatcham railway station =

Railway station serving the town of Thatcham, Berkshire, England

Thatcham
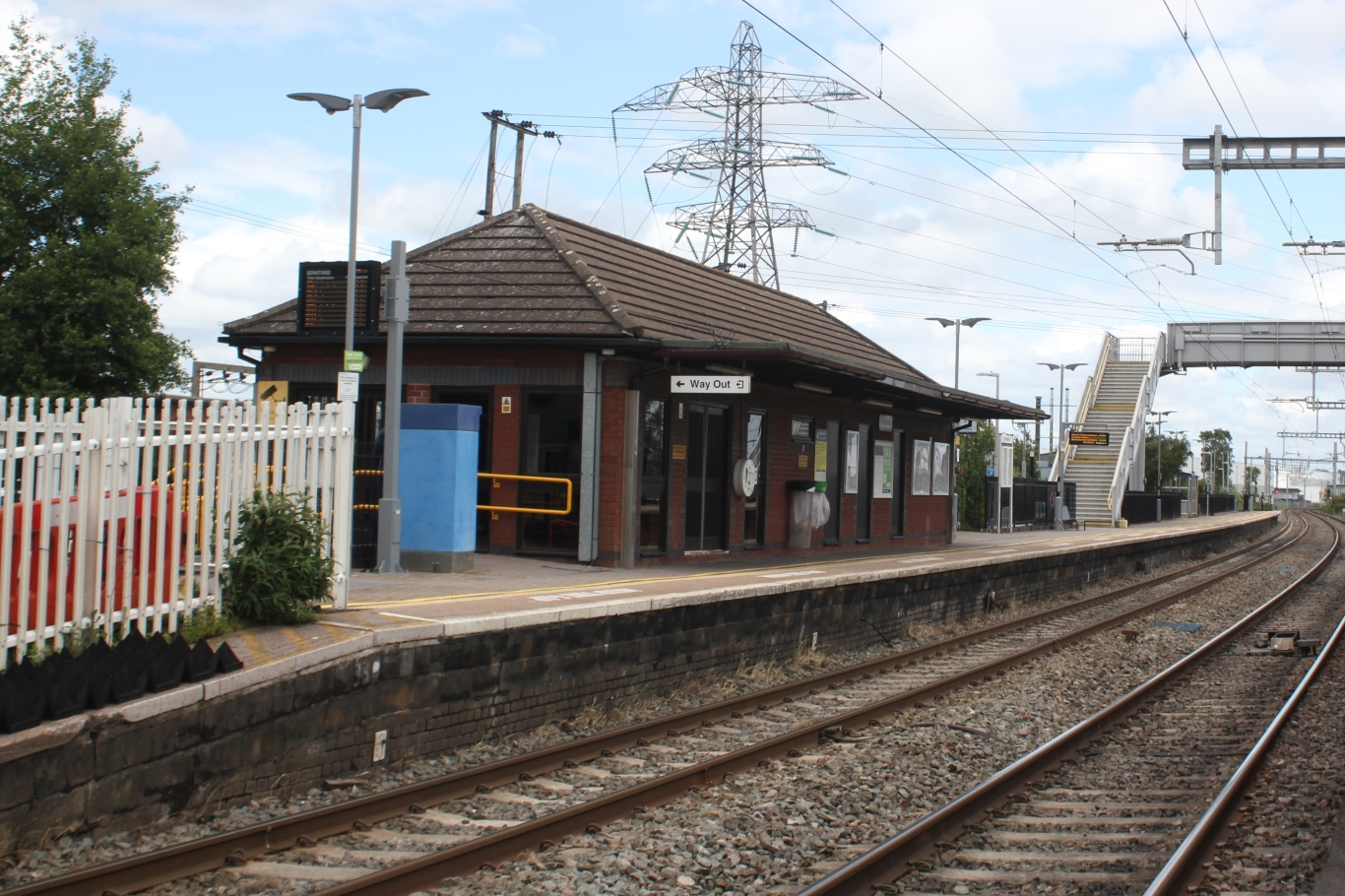

General information
- Location: Thatcham, West Berkshire; England
- Coordinates: 51.394°N 1.243°W
- Grid reference: SU528663
- Managed by: Great Western Railway
- Platforms: 2

Other information
- Station code: THA
- Classification: DfT category E

History
- Opened: 21 December 1847
- Original company: Great Western Railway
- Pre-grouping: GWR
- Post-grouping: GWR

Passengers
- 2020/21: ▼0.107 million
- 2021/22: ▲0.307 million
- 2022/23: ▲0.363 million
- 2023/24: ▲0.408 million
- 2024/25: ▲0.465 million
Location
Notes
- Passenger statistics from the Office of Rail and Road

Thatcham railway station serves the market town of Thatcham in Berkshire, England. It is 49 miles 45 chains (49.56 mi; 79.8 km) measured from the zero point at London Paddington. It is served by Great Western Railway local services between Reading and Newbury and Bedwyn.

It was served before privatisation by Network SouthEast and from 1996 until 2004 by Thames Trains. A limited semi-fast service between London and Westbury and Frome also calls.

== Services ==
Thatcham station is served by GWR local services between Reading and Newbury, and between London Paddington and Newbury. A limited number of services operate between London Paddington and Bedwyn, as well as destinations in the West Country.

These services are summarised as follows.

Preceding station	National Rail	Following station
Theale	Great Western Railway; London Paddington–Taunton, etc. (Limited service)	Newbury
Theale	Great Western Railway; London Paddington–Newbury	Newbury
Midgham	Great Western Railway; Reading–Newbury	Newbury Racecourse

== History ==
Thatcham station was opened on 21 December 1847 as part of the Berks and Hants Line to Hungerford. Traffic through the station increased when the line was extended to Taunton in 1906. The station remained as part of the Great Western Railway (GWR) until railway nationalisation in 1948. After the sectorisation of British Rail in 1982 the station became part of Network SouthEast until the privatisation of British Rail. From 1996 services were provided by Thames Trains until the franchise was merged with First Great Western.

=== Thatcham Ordnance Depot ===
In 1940 the 332nd Engineer General Service Regiment of the United States Army built an ordnance depot next to the main line just west of the station. This included a number of sidings that were used for the delivery of equipment. After the Second World War the site was developed as a base for what later became the Royal Logistic Corps and had a number of steam locomotives used for shunting.

The base was closed in 1999 and its site has now been developed as a housing estate.

== Current layout ==
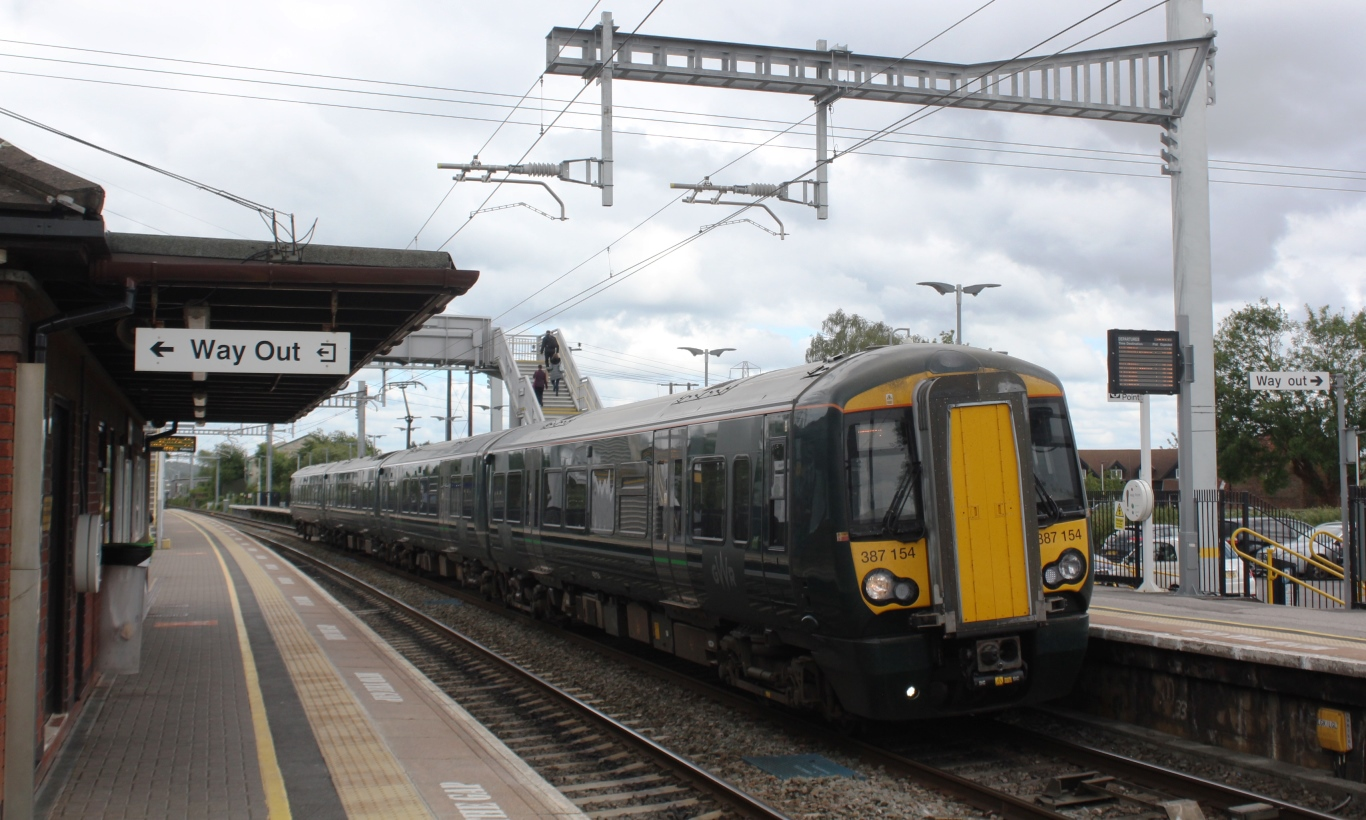
A GWR Class 387 from Reading to Newbury in platform 1

Thatcham station has two platforms, one on each side of the main line. At the eastern end of the station there is a footbridge over the line, replacing the old footbridge that was located at the western end. At the western end of the platform there is a level crossing.

On the up platform is a ticket office that is open Mondays to Saturdays and two access points to the station car park. On the north side of the line west of the station is a Royal Mail sorting office next to where the ordnance depot used to be.

On the down platform is a small shelter and access to a small car park. The Kennet and Avon Canal runs parallel to the station and can be reached from the road at the western end of the station.

During 2018 the station was closed for periods as part of the overhead electrification of the Reading to Taunton line, which allowed for the running of the Hitachi built British Rail Class 800 and Class 387 commuter trains.
