= HMS Thatcham =

Minesweeper of the Royal Navy

History

United Kingdom
- Name: HMS Thatcham
- Namesake: Thatcham
- Builder: Jones Slip
- Launched: 25 September 1957
- Completed: 17 April 1958
- Fate: Sold 1986

General characteristics
- Class & type: Ham-class minesweeper
- Notes: Pennant number(s): M2790 / IMS90

HMS Thatcham was one of 93 ships of the Ham-class of inshore minesweepers.

Their names were all chosen from villages ending in -ham. The minesweeper was named after Thatcham in Berkshire.
