= Ashmore Green =

Coordinates: 51°25′16″N 1°16′30″W

- Hamlet
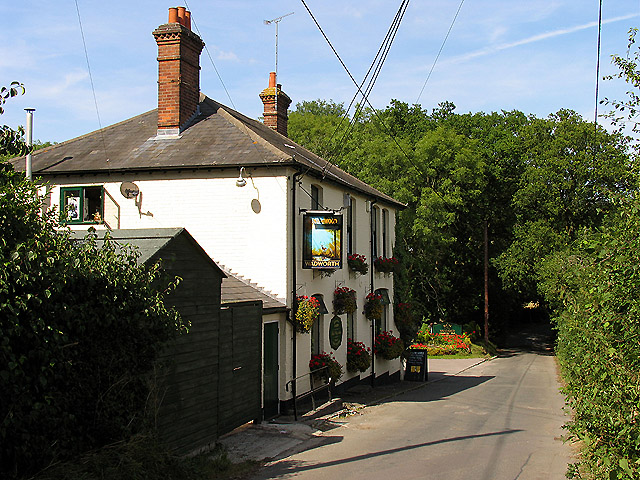
- The Sun in the Wood (closed since 2018)

- Location within Berkshire
- OS grid reference: SU5069
- Shire county: Berkshire
- Region: South East
- Country: England
- Sovereign state: United Kingdom
- Postcode district: RG18
- Police: Thames Valley
- Fire: Royal Berkshire
- Ambulance: South Central

Ashmore Green is a hamlet in Berkshire, England. It is situated just to the west of the village of Cold Ash and to the north of Thatcham in the West Berkshire district.

== Etymology ==
The name Ashmore Green is probably of Old English origin, meaning "ash tree covered moor". The ash tree held significance for the Saxons due to the mythical Yggdrasil and the ash tree being sacred to the god Wōden. Ash trees are common in Berkshire, as is reflected in other settlement names such as nearby Cold Ash and Ashampstead, as well as Ashford Hill and Ashmansworth in bordering Hampshire and Ashbury in Oxfordshire.

== History ==
Ashmore Green is first mentioned in a deed in 1549 from Jack O'Newbury to his son Henry. It is believed the Parliamentary Army stayed in fields near Ashmore Green during the Second Battle of Newbury in 1644. Ashmore Green was first noted on a map in 1761 spelled "Ashmoor Green". The area was largely moorland and heath until it began to be populated in the 1800s. In 1886, a baptist chapel was built in the centre of Ashmore Green, on Stoney Lane. It closed in the 1960s. In 1894, Ashmore Green became part of the Cold Ash civil parish. The population of the Ashmore Green and Cold Ash area nearly doubled between 1900 and 1939, with a major expansion after World War II. The local pub, The Sun in the Wood, built around 1900, closed in 2018.

== Nearby Settlements ==
- Cold Ash
- Thatcham
- Newbury
- Reading
- Shaw
- Curridge
