= Newbury West Fields Halt railway station =

Former railway station in England

Newbury West Fields Halt
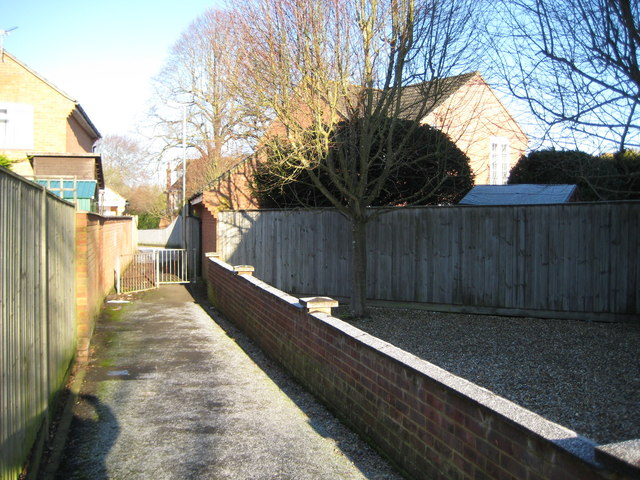
- Station site in 2010.

General information
- Location: West Fields, Newbury, Berkshire; England
- Coordinates: 51.3986°N 1.3392°W
- Grid reference: SU460668
- Platforms: 1

Other information
- Status: Disused

History
- Original company: Great Western Railway
- Pre-grouping: Great Western Railway
- Post-grouping: Great Western Railway

Key dates
- 1906: Opened
- 1957: Closed
Location

Newbury West Fields Halt was a railway station in Newbury, Berkshire, England, on the Lambourn Valley Railway. It served the West Fields area of Newbury.

== History ==
The station opened on 1 October 1906; the last station on the line to open. It was built as part of an improvement programme undertaken after the Great Western Railway's acquisition of the line on 2 July 1906.

Until 1934, the station was staffed. In September 1956, Newbury West Fields Halt was removed from the rail timetables but continued to carry passengers, small goods, and milk. The station closed on 4 February 1957, the first on the line to do so. The station was demolished after closure and the site of the railway formation is now covered by housing development.

| Preceding station | Disused railways | Following station |
|---|---|---|
| Newbury | Great Western Railway; Lambourn Valley Railway | Speen |
