= Greater Western franchise =

Railway franchise in the UK

Greater Western
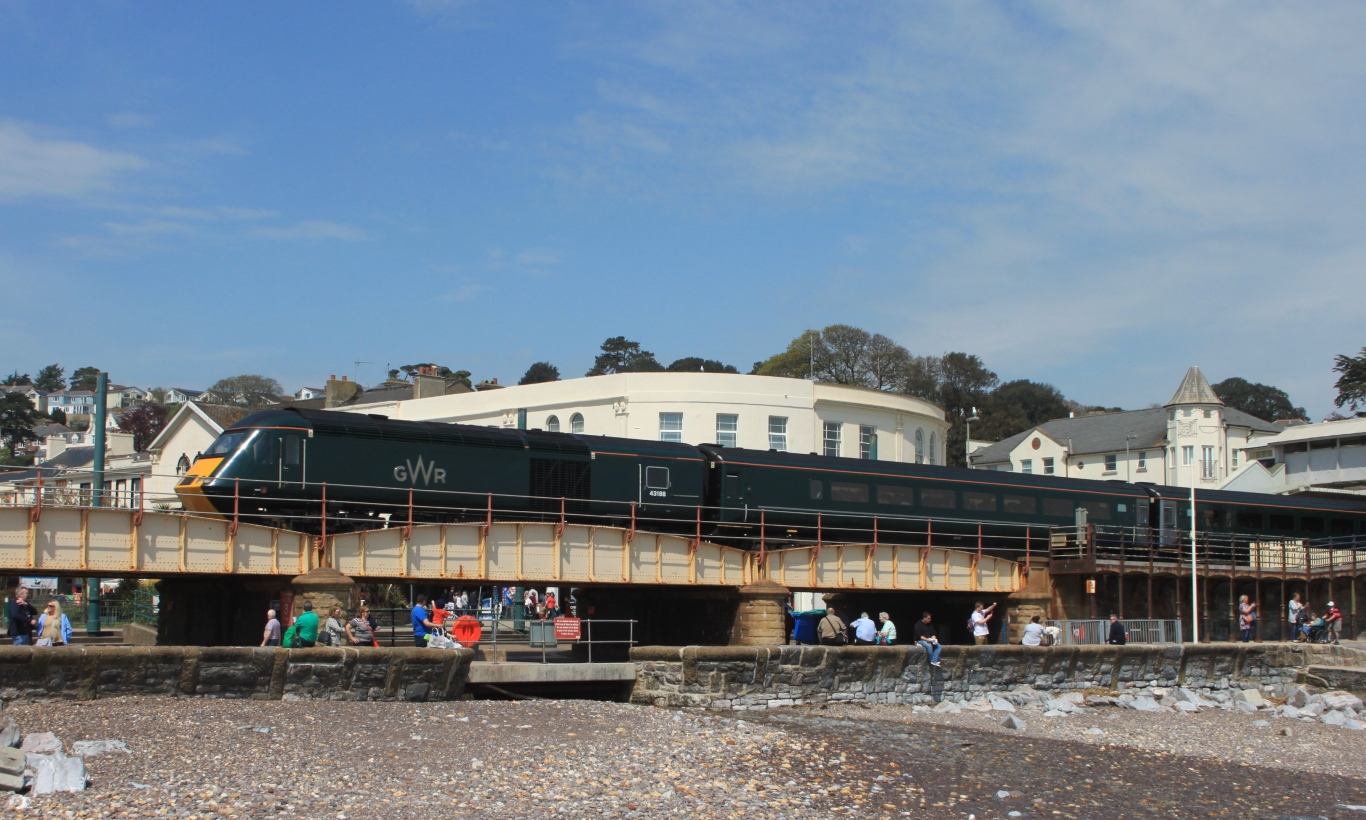
- The current holder of the Greater Western passenger franchise is Great Western Railway (formerly First Great Western)
- Operator: Great Western Railway
- Main Routes: Great Western Main Line, South Wales Main Line, Reading to Taunton Line, South Devon Main Line, Cornish Main Line, Wessex Main Line
- Dates of operation: 1 April 2006 – 25 June 2028

Other
- Website: https://www.gov.uk/government/publications/first-great-western
Route map

Greater Western is a railway franchise for the provision of passenger services from London Paddington to the Cotswolds, West of England, South West England and South Wales. The current holder is Great Western Railway.

== History ==
In 2003, as part of a franchise reorganisation by the Strategic Rail Authority, it was announced that the Great Western, Thames Trains and Wessex Trains franchises would be combined to form the Greater Western Franchise. This was part of a strategy to reduce the number of train operating companies providing services from a single London terminal, in order to improve efficiency and reliability.

In April 2005, the Authority announced that FirstGroup, National Express and Stagecoach had been shortlisted to bid for the new franchise.

In December 2005, the Department for Transport awarded the franchise to FirstGroup, with the services operated by First Great Western, First Great Western Link and Wessex Trains transferred to First Great Western on 1 April 2006.

The franchise was for ten years with the last three years being optional. Unusually, this option could be exercised by either party; elsewhere these options are at the sole discretion of the Department for Transport. On 14 May 2011, First announced it would not be taking up the option, with the franchise to end on 31 March 2013, citing a desire for a longer-term contract due to the impending upgrade to the Great Western Main Line.

In January 2013, the government announced the franchise competition had been cancelled, with the existing franchise extended until 12 October 2013 when it would be terminated. Negotiations took place with First in January 2013 for it to run the franchise on a management contract basis for two years. A two-year franchise extension until September 2015 was agreed in October 2013, and subsequently extended until March 2019. An extension to April 2019 was granted in March 2015. In 2016 an extension to March 2020 was announced on the First Group website, and this was confirmed by the government in November 2017, along with an intention to discuss with First a continuation until March 2022.

== Cancelled 2013 franchise competition ==
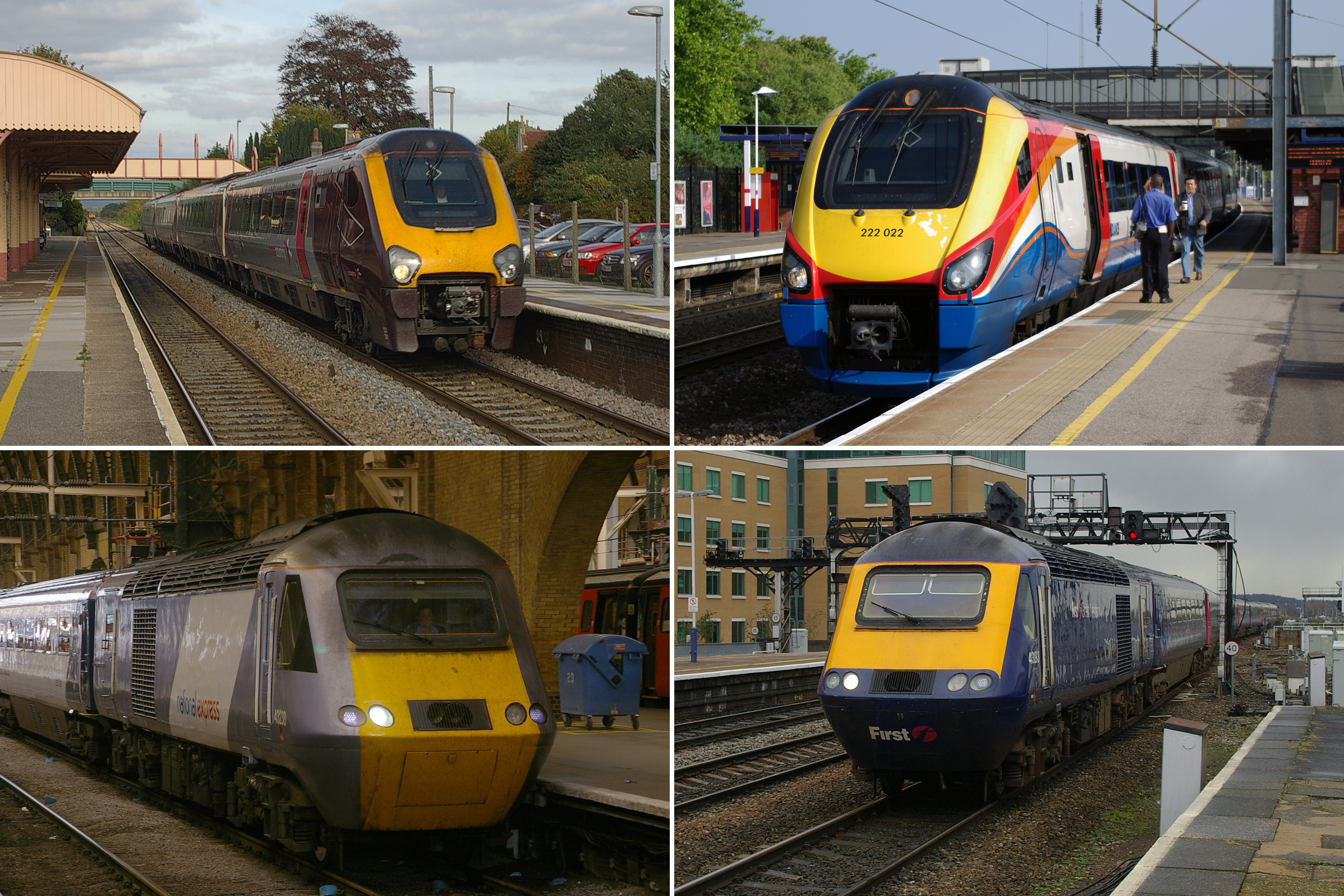
Four bidders pre-qualified for the 2013 Great Western passenger franchise: clockwise from top left, Arriva, Stagecoach, First and National Express

Expressions of interest in bidding for the new franchise were called for in December 2011 and in March 2012 it was announced that Arriva UK Trains, FirstGroup, National Express and Stagecoach had been shortlisted to bid. The winner was to be announced in December 2012, with the new franchisee taking over in April 2013, however, it was announced in July 2012 that the franchise would be extended due to the late issue of the invitation to tender (ITT).

The ITT was released at the end of July 2012, with bids to be submitted in October 2012, the winner announced in March 2013, and operations commence on 21 July 2013. However, in the wake of the InterCity West Coast refranchising process collapsing, the government announced in October 2012 that the process would be put on hold pending the results of a review.

The new franchise was to have run for 15 years and seen the introduction of new InterCity Express Trains, capacity enhancements and smart ticketing.

== Possible future services ==
In October 2013, a document released by the government which described the economic case for High Speed 2 (HS2) included indications of future plans for the national rail network, as a 'Do Minimum' baseline against which HS2 was compared. The assumptions for the Greater Western franchise included:

- introduction of a service between Birmingham New Street and London Paddington;
- reduction in services between Oxford and Paddington, in favour of Chiltern Railways service between London Marylebone and Oxford;
- removal of services starting at Paddington and ending at Didcot Parkway;
- the replacement of local services between Paddington and Reading by an extended Heathrow Express service from Heathrow Terminal 5, using a proposed western access to Heathrow;
- doubling the service frequency between Bristol Temple Meads and Paddington;
- increasing service frequency between Paddington and Cheltenham Spa;
- increasing service frequency between Paddington and Hereford.

== Future of the franchise ==
In November 2017, the government announced it was considering splitting the franchise, to create a new West of England franchise to provide long-distance services between London, Wiltshire, Somerset, Devon and Cornwall together, with local and regional services across the south-west. This proposal was dropped by the Department for Transport after a consultation. At the same time, the government confirmed its intention to extend the franchise to March 2020, and proposed a further extension to March 2022. In March 2020, a further extension to 31 March 2023 was awarded by the DfT with an option to extend for a further year.

In June 2022, following the COVID-19 emergency measures, the DfT replaced GWR's franchise agreement with a direct award contract expiring on 25 June 2028.
