= Kennet School =

Location
- Stoney Lane; Thatcham, Berkshire, RG19 4LL; England; 51°24′05″N 1°14′55″W

Information
- Type: Academy
- Motto: Excellence through Endeavour
- Established: 1957; 69 years ago
- School board: Local Governing Board
- Department for Education URN: 136647 Tables
- Ofsted: Reports
- Head teacher: Max Gayler
- Gender: Coeducational
- Age: 11 to 18
- Enrolment: approx. 1 800
- Houses: 4: St David, St Francis, St Michael, St Patrick
- Colours: Navy blue and gold
- Publication: Kennet News (1975–1990); Kennet Chronicle (2002–2004)
- Website: http://www.kennetschool.co.uk/

Kennet School is a co-educational secondary school located on Stoney Lane in Thatcham in Berkshire, England. Founded in 1957, it is an academy. As of 2026, the school had approximately 1 800 pupils enrolled.

== School structure ==
=== Houses ===
When pupils join the school, they become a member of a house. The house system provides a structure for pastoral care and competition through sports (including amongst others rugby, netball athletics, football hockey), music, performing arts and day-to-day studies through the award of house points and commendation.

There are four houses at the school: St Patrick, St Michael, St Francis, and St David. Now defunct houses are St George and St Andrew, which were dissolved in the mid to late 1980s. Each house is associated with a colour.

=== Sixth form ===
There is a Sixth Form at Kennet for students who wish to continue their education after the age of 16. There is a section of the library provided for Sixth Form use only.

== History ==
Kennet school opened on 11 September 1957 as a secondary modern, before converting into a comprehensive in 1971

The Risman Library

The Risman Library was opened on 23 September 1997 by Councillor Ann Risman, the Chairperson of Berkshire County Council, who was accompanied by Chris Woodhead, Her Majesty's Chief Inspector of Schools in England. The library is designed to be a low energy environment by incorporating high levels of natural light and ventilation. It stocks over 22,000 books, has seating for pupils and has a separate Sixth Form study section, which doubles as a seminar room.

Kennet is one of few schools in England to have three specialisms: in September 2000 the school was given Technology College status. In February 2002 a new technology block was built on the north of the site to replace dispersed classrooms. In March 2005 the school received Arts College status Most recently in April 2006 it was awarded the status of Language College.

On 1 April 2011, it changed to an academy.

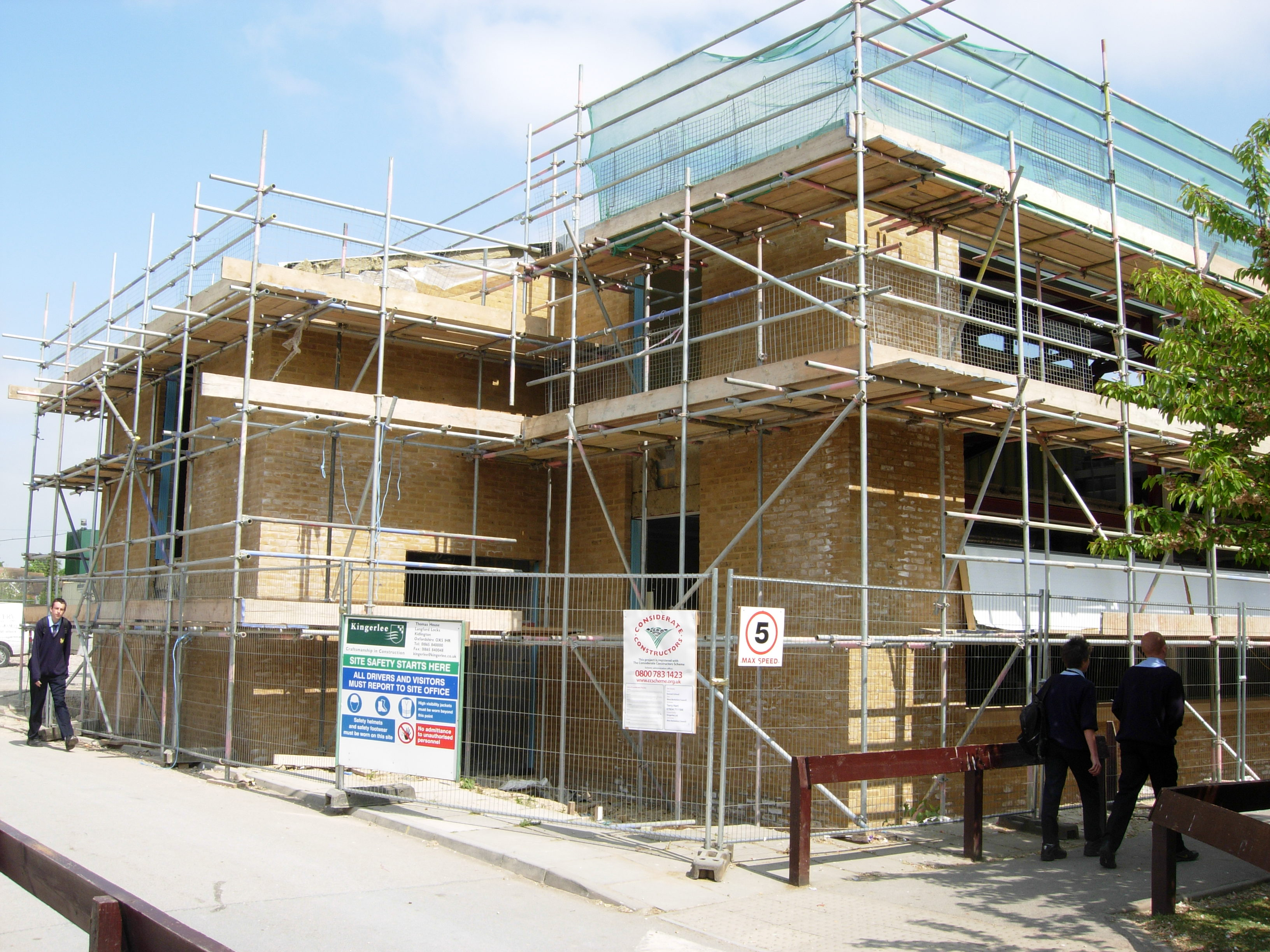
The sixth form block under construction

In 2016 accusations were reported of child sex abuse by former teacher Robert Neill (1986-2003). The school was criticised for not following professional guidelines and missing opportunities to prevent the abuse, prompting an investigation by the West Berkshire Safeguarding Children Board. In 2016, a local vicar Pete Jarvis was accused of child sex offences. Jarvis was an active member of the school community and held youth counselling sessions with students. Since then, Kennet School has been reported by OFSTED to be 'highly vigilant' in keeping pupils safe.

In September 2017, Kennet School and the West Berkshire Council had a legal dispute over £43,000 allegedly owed to the council over the use of the conjoined leisure centre.

== Awards and recognition ==
Kennet was awarded the Artsmark Gold by the Arts Council England in 2001, 2004, 2007, 2010, and 2013; and the Platinum award in 2018. It was also awarded the Sportsmark by Sport England in 2001. The school was also awarded the Challenge Award by National Association for Able Children in Education on 22 November 2006 and re-accredited on in November 2010 and November 2017 respectively, as recognition for its efforts to support Able, Gifted and Talented pupils. Kennet was only the 16th school in the country to receive the award at the time.

=== Teaching awards ===
The previous headmaster, Paul Dick (1989-2017) was appointed an OBE for Services to Education in the 2000 New Year Honours. Paul Dick was also the Category Winner in 2001 in The Leadership Trust Award for School Leadership in a Secondary School in South of England.

== Sport and extracurricular activities ==
=== Facilities ===
Kennet School provides a wide array of facilities and resources for its students.

Examples of Facilities:

- Bespoke Drama Theatre

- Media Studio

- Music Technology Facility

- Coding Labs

- Science Laboratories

- Library & Study Spaces

- Sports Facilities (Modern gym, outdoor sports fields plus sharing facilities with Kennet Leisure Centre)

- Physical Disability Resource (PDR)

=== Kennet News ===
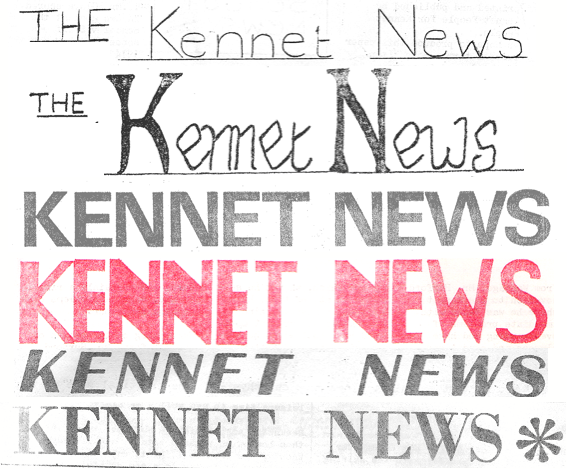
Kennet News mastheads

The Kennet News school newspaper was first issued in May 1975 at the price of two new pence and ran until the late 1980s.

== Ofsted ==
In 2005 the school was criticised in the Office for Standards in Education (Ofsted) report for lacking 'a daily act of collective worship' and not reporting pupils' ICT progress in years 10 and 11, both of which are statutory requirements. All maintained English schools must provide daily worship that is broadly Christian, although parents can remove their children and sixth formers may decline to attend. Since the school is now an academy (not a maintained school) this requirement does not necessarily apply. The report also found that not all subject department heads have good enough monitoring systems to improve the quality of teaching and learning.

The 2008 reduced tariff report rated the school overall as "outstanding". The main recommendations of the report were to improve sixth form teaching including inconsistency in the quality of teaching between subjects and setting more accurately the right standard of work to stretch and develop pupils. The local Member of Parliament, Richard Benyon, has in the past spoken out over shortfalls for the budget towards Kennet School's sixth form which could explain its under performance in relation to the rest of the school.

The inspection in 2014, resulted in the school being rated as "Requires Improvement", although the sixth form was noted in the report as being "good".

The May 2016 inspection resulted in the school regaining its "Outstanding" status which has been since reconfirmed via the November 2022 inspection.

The school now has a 'Good' status with Outstanding Sixth Form provision.

== Notable alumni ==
- Henry Bolton, British politician and UKIP leader
- Louise Sugden, Paralympic Medallist (2020) in Para Powerlifting, 3x Paralympic Athlete in 2 sports

== Headteachers ==
George Hurford
(1961 to 1978)

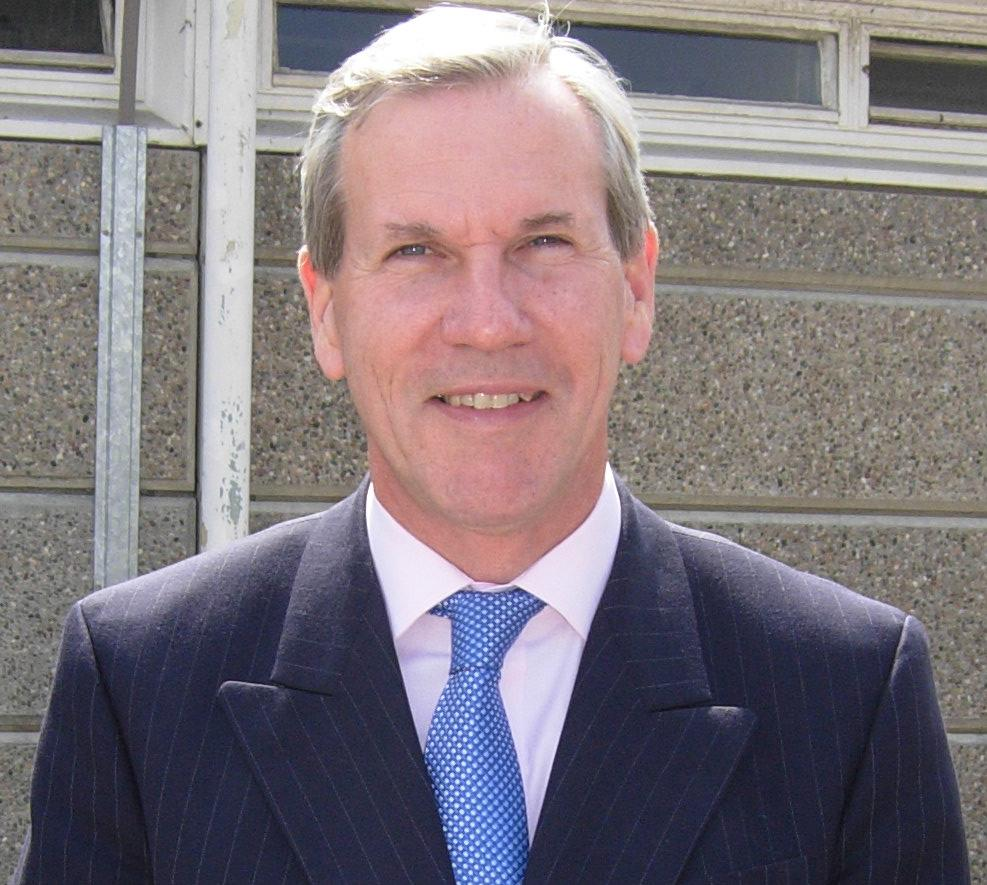
Paul Dick
(1989 to 2017)

Kennet's headmasters and headmistress, starting from establishment in 1957, are.

Years	Name
Kennet Modern School
September 1957 to December 1960	Ben Howe
January 1961 to July 1971	George Hurford
Kennet Comprehensive School
September 1971 to July 1978	George Hurford
September 1978 to July 1982	Terrence Enright
September 1982 to December 1982	Keith Iles (acting)
January 1983 to July 1987	Nicholas Wheeler-Robinson
September 1987 to December 1988	Keith Iles (acting)
January 1989 to 31 January 2009	Paul Dick
1 February 2009 to 31 August 2010	Paul Dick (executive); Susan Croft (associate)
1 December 2010 to 31 March 2011	Paul Dick (executive); Paul German (associate)
Kennet School (Academy)
1 April 2011 to 3 September 2012	Paul Dick (executive); Paul German (associate)
4 September 2012 to 21 December 2017	Paul Dick
4 January 2018 to September 2022	Gemma Piper (interim until officially appointed Executive Headteacher in February 2018)
September 2022 to present	Grace Rigg (interim until officially appointed in November 2022)
April 2026 to present	Max Gayler (Maternity Cover)
