= Speen railway station =

Former railway station in England

Speen
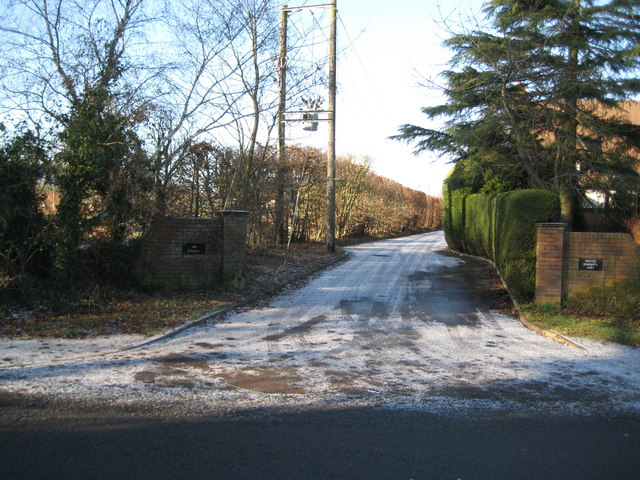
- Station site in 2010.

General information
- Location: Speen, Berkshire; England
- Coordinates: 51.4116°N 1.3447°W
- Grid reference: SU456683
- Platforms: 1

Other information
- Status: Disused

History
- Original company: Lambourn Valley Railway
- Pre-grouping: Great Western Railway
- Post-grouping: Great Western Railway

Key dates
- 4 April 1898: Opened
- 4 January 1960: Closed
Location

Speen railway station served the village of Speen, Berkshire, England, on the Lambourn Valley Railway.

The station had one platform with, in its later years, two small buildings, one being of the GWR's pagoda style.

== History ==
The station opened on 4 April 1898 as Speen for Donnington. It was occasionally referred to by this name in official documentation until at least 1932.

=== Goods traffic ===
The station dealt with a high percentage of livestock and dairy traffic.

=== Closure ===
It closed on 4 January 1960.

Preceding station	Disused railways	Following station
Newbury West Fields Halt	Great Western Railway; Lambourn Valley Railway	Stockcross and Bagnor Halt
