= First Great Western Link =

English train operating company

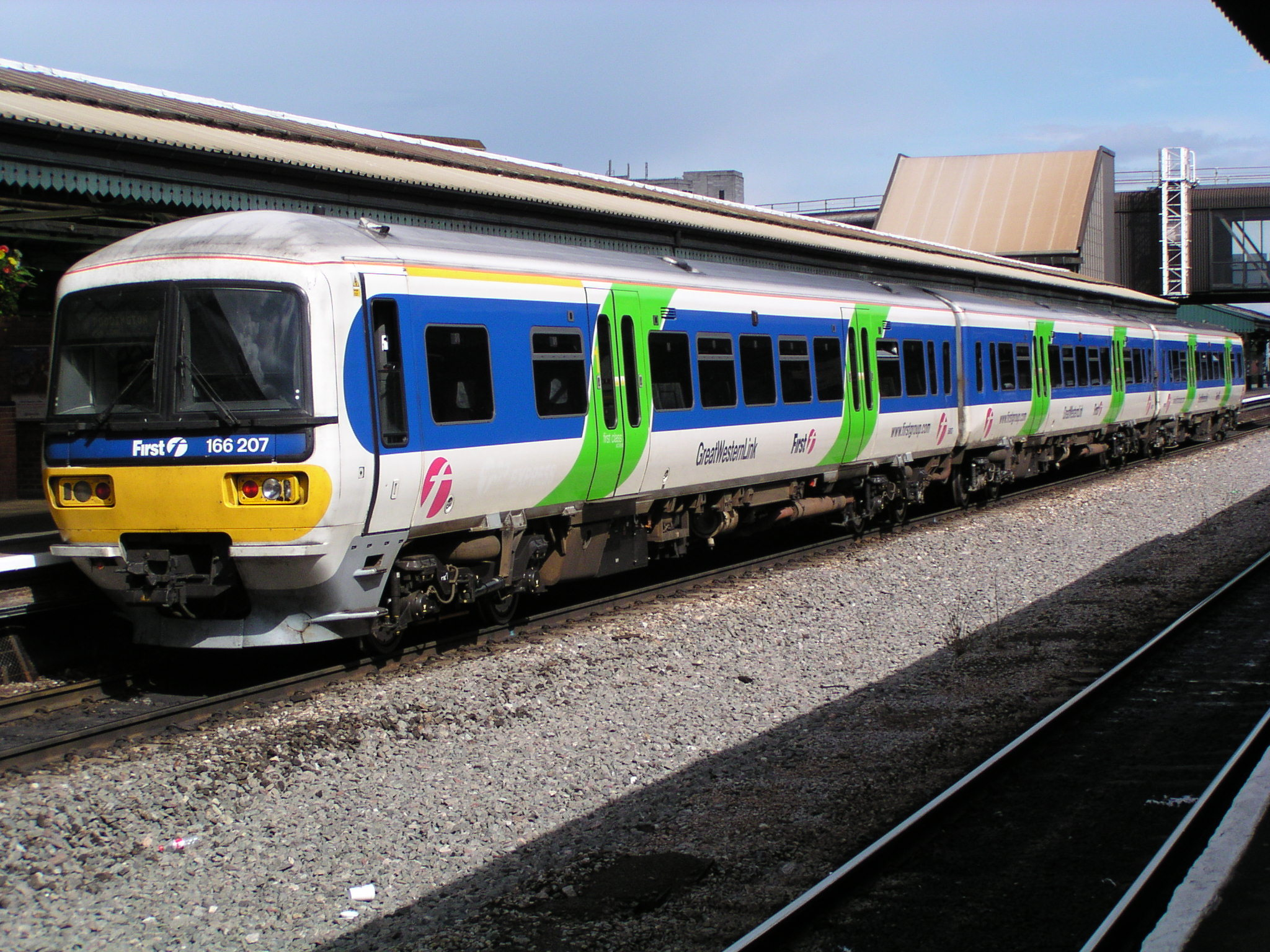
- Class 166 Networker Turbo at Reading in 2004

Overview
- Franchises: Thames; 1 April 2004 – 31 March 2006
- Main regions: Greater London, Southeast England
- Other regions: East Midlands, Southwest England, West Midlands
- Fleet: 62
- Stations called at: 95
- Parent company: FirstGroup
- Reporting mark: FK
- Predecessor: Thames Trains
- Successor: First Great Western

Other
- Website: www.firstgreatwestern.co.uk/link

First Great Western Link (FGWL) was a British train operating company owned by FirstGroup that operated the Thames franchise from April 2004 until March 2006.

== History ==
In April 2003 the Strategic Rail Authority invited FirstGroup and Go-Ahead to bid for a two-year extension to the Thames franchise that would coincide with the end date of the First Great Western franchise, after which both would become part of the Greater Western franchise. In November 2003 the Strategic Rail Authority awarded the new franchise to First with the services operated by Thames Trains transferring to FGWL on 1 April 2004.

On 12 June 2005 Heathrow Connect was introduced as a joint venture between FGWL and BAA. BAA supplied the Class 360 rolling stock and on-board staff. FGWL received the revenue for journeys between Paddington and Hayes & Harlington, and BAA the revenue for journeys between Hayes & Harlington and Heathrow Airport.

== Services ==
FGWL ran services along the Great Western Main Line from London Paddington to Didcot with services continuing to north to Oxford, Bicester Town, Hereford and Stratford-upon-Avon. It also operated services on the Greenford, Windsor & Eton Central, Marlow, Henley and Bedwyn lines and on the Reading to Basingstoke and North Downs lines.

The Stratford-upon-Avon service was transferred to Chiltern Railways in December 2004 with FGWL ceasing to operate beyond Banbury.

- Great Western Main Line (Local services between London Paddington and Didcot Parkway).
- Cherwell Valley Line (Didcot Parkway - Oxford)
- Cotswold Line (Oxford - Hereford)
- North Downs Line (Reading - Redhill)
- Reading to Plymouth Line (Reading - Bedwyn)
- Reading to Basingstoke Line (Reading - Basingstoke)
- Slough to Windsor & Eton Line (Slough - Windsor and Eton Central)
- Oxford to Bicester Line (Oxford - Bicester Town)
- Marlow Branch Line (Maidenhead - Marlow)
- Henley Branch Line (Twyford railway station - Henley-on-Thames)
- Greenford Branch Line (London Paddington - Greenford)

== Rolling stock ==
FGWL inherited a fleet of Class 165s and 166s from Thames Trains. A franchise commitment was to use five Class 180 Adelantes from sister company First Great Western on Cotswold Line services from December 2004, releasing five Class 165s for transfer to Chiltern Railways. Because of the short nature of the franchise and the fact that the Class 165s and 166s had only recently been repainted, the Thames Trains livery of white, blue and green was retained with FGWL branding applied.

Fleet at end of franchise
Class	Image	Type	Top speed		Number	Built
Class	Image	Type	mph	km/h	Number	Built
Class 165/1 Networker Turbo		diesel multiple unit	90	145	36	1990–1992
Class 166 Networker Turbo		diesel multiple unit	90	145	21	1992–1993

== Depot ==
FGWL's fleet was maintained at Reading TMD.

== Demise ==
On 6 November 2002 as part of a franchise reorganisation by the Strategic Rail Authority, it was announced that the Great Western, Thames Trains and Wessex Trains franchises would be combined to form the Greater Western franchise. This was part of a Strategic Rail Authority strategy to reduce the number of train operating companies providing services from a single London terminus. This was expected to improve efficiency and reliability.

In December 2005 the Department for Transport awarded the new Greater Western franchise to First with the services operated by FGWL transferring to First Great Western on 1 April 2006.

Preceded by Thames Trains	Operator of Thames franchise 2004–2006	Succeeded by First Great Western; Greater Western franchise
