= Thames Trains =

Former British train operating company

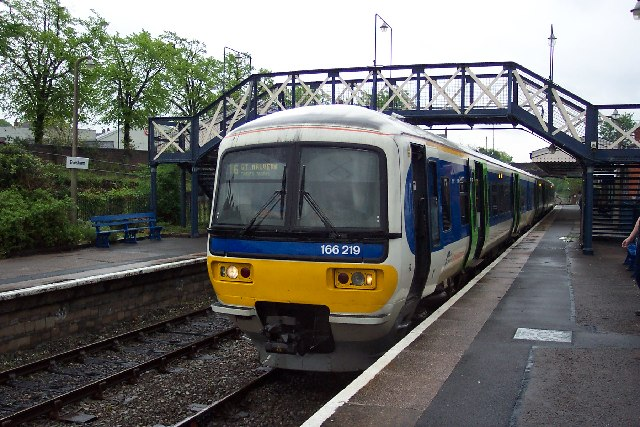
- Class 166 Networker Turbo at Evesham in 2003

Overview
- Franchises: Thames Trains; 13 October 1996 – 31 March 2004
- Main regions: Greater London, Southeast England
- Other regions: East Midlands, Southwest England, West Midlands
- Fleet: 57 (March 2004)
- Stations called at: 95
- Parent company: Go-Ahead Group
- Reporting mark: TT
- Successor: First Great Western Link

Other
- Website: www.thamestrains.co.uk

Thames Trains was a British train operating company owned by the Go-Ahead Group, which operated the Thames Trains franchise from October 1996 until March 2004.

== History ==
The Thames Trains franchise was awarded by the Director of Passenger Rail Franchising to Victory Rail Holdings, a company owned by Go-Ahead (65%) and some ex-British Rail managers (35%), with operations commencing on 13 October 1996. Go-Ahead bought the remaining shares it did not own in June 1998.

The Ladbroke Grove rail crash of 5 October 1999 involved a Thames Trains Class 165, which had failed to stop at a red signal. Thames Trains was fined £2 million for violations of health and safety law in connection with the incident, and was also ordered to pay £75,000 in costs.

== Services ==
Thames Trains ran services along the Great Western Main Line from London Paddington to Didcot with services continuing north to Oxford, Bicester Town, Hereford and Stratford-upon-Avon. It also operated services on the Greenford, Windsor & Eton Central, Marlow, Henley and Bedwyn lines and on the Reading to Basingstoke and North Downs lines.

In 1998 a service from Oxford to Bristol was introduced in partnership with First Great Western. This was withdrawn in 2003 to relieve congestion, at the request of the Strategic Rail Authority.

== Rolling stock ==
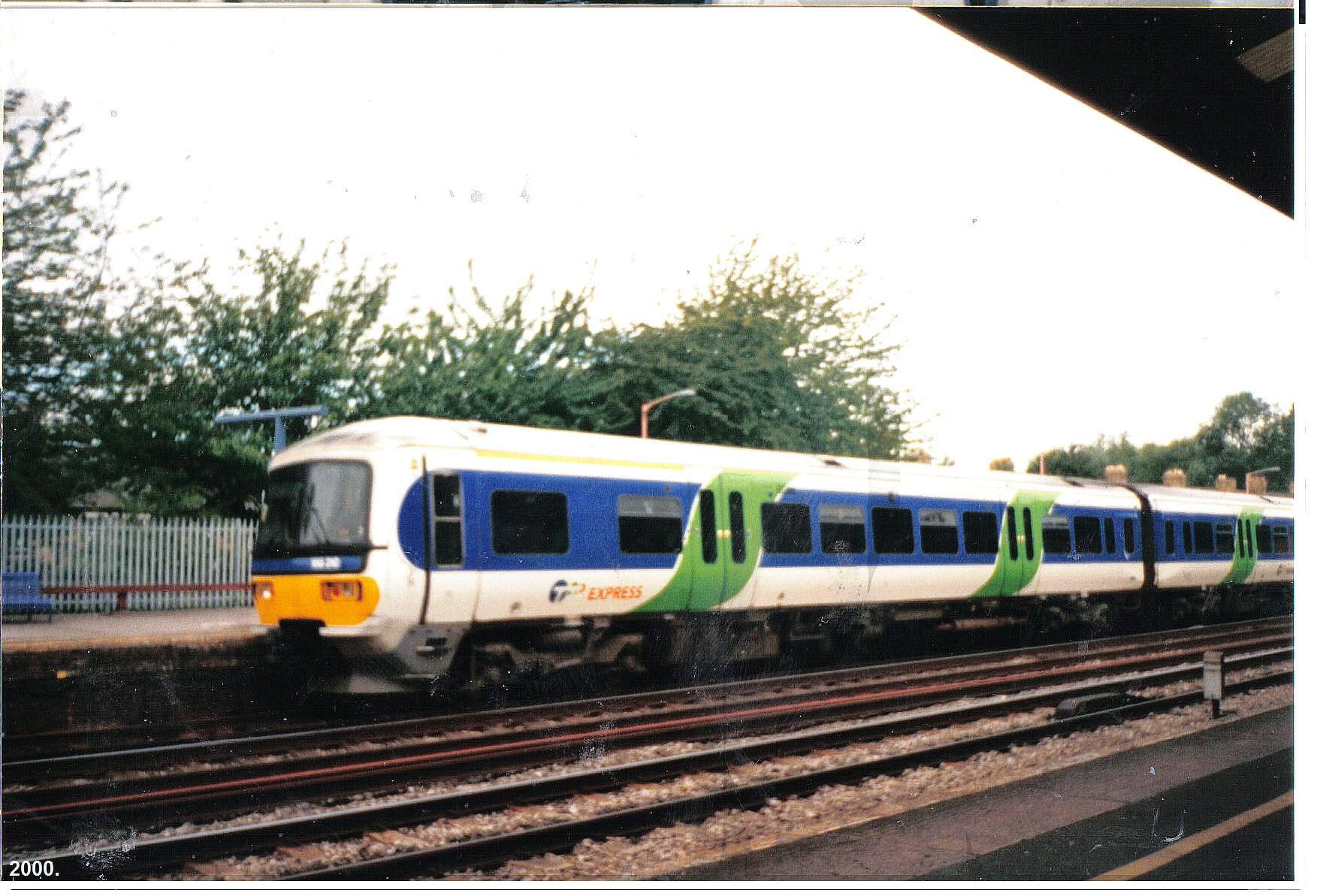
A Class 166 Networker Turbo unit at Oxford.

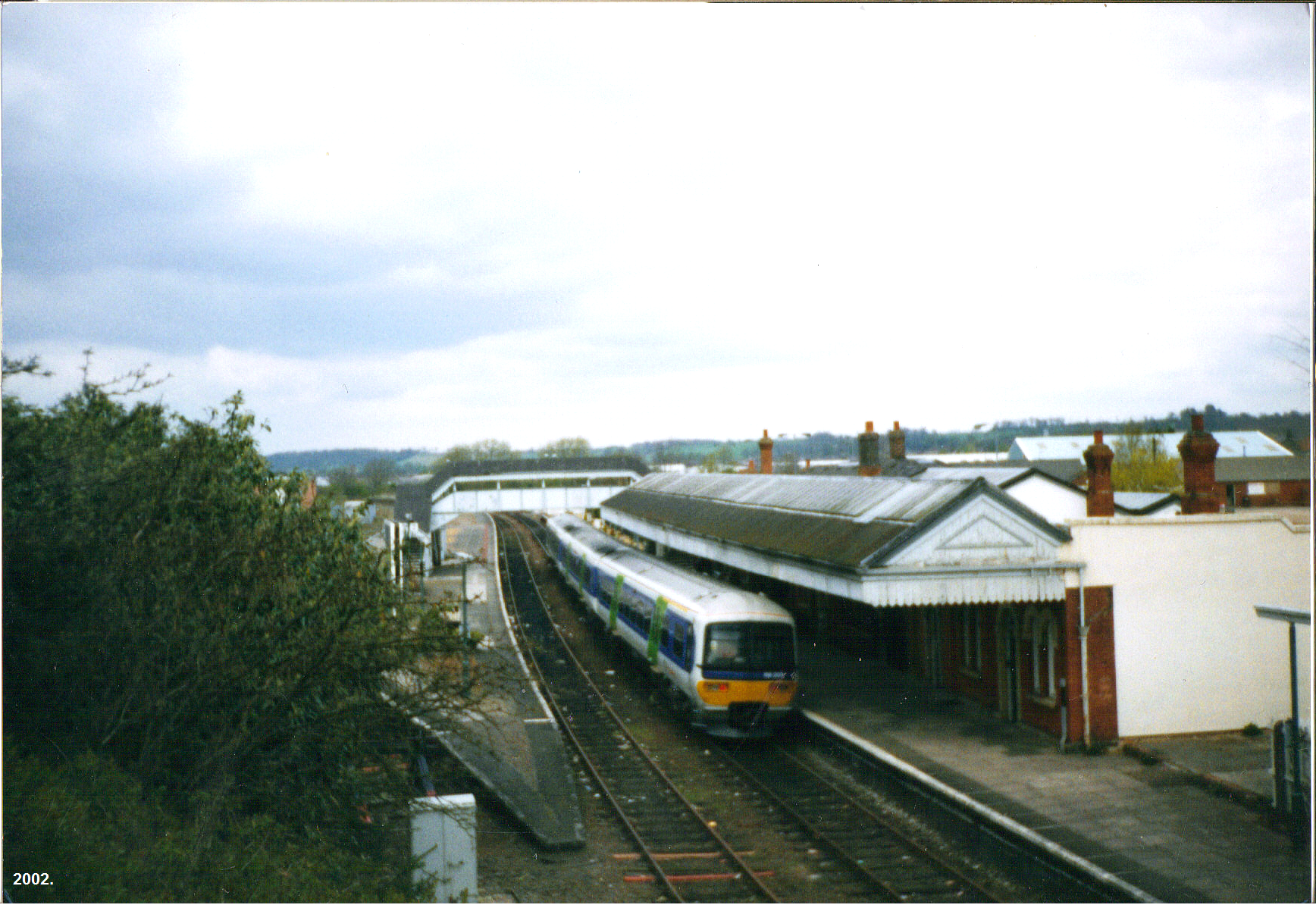
A Class 166 at Stratford-upon-Avon in 2002.

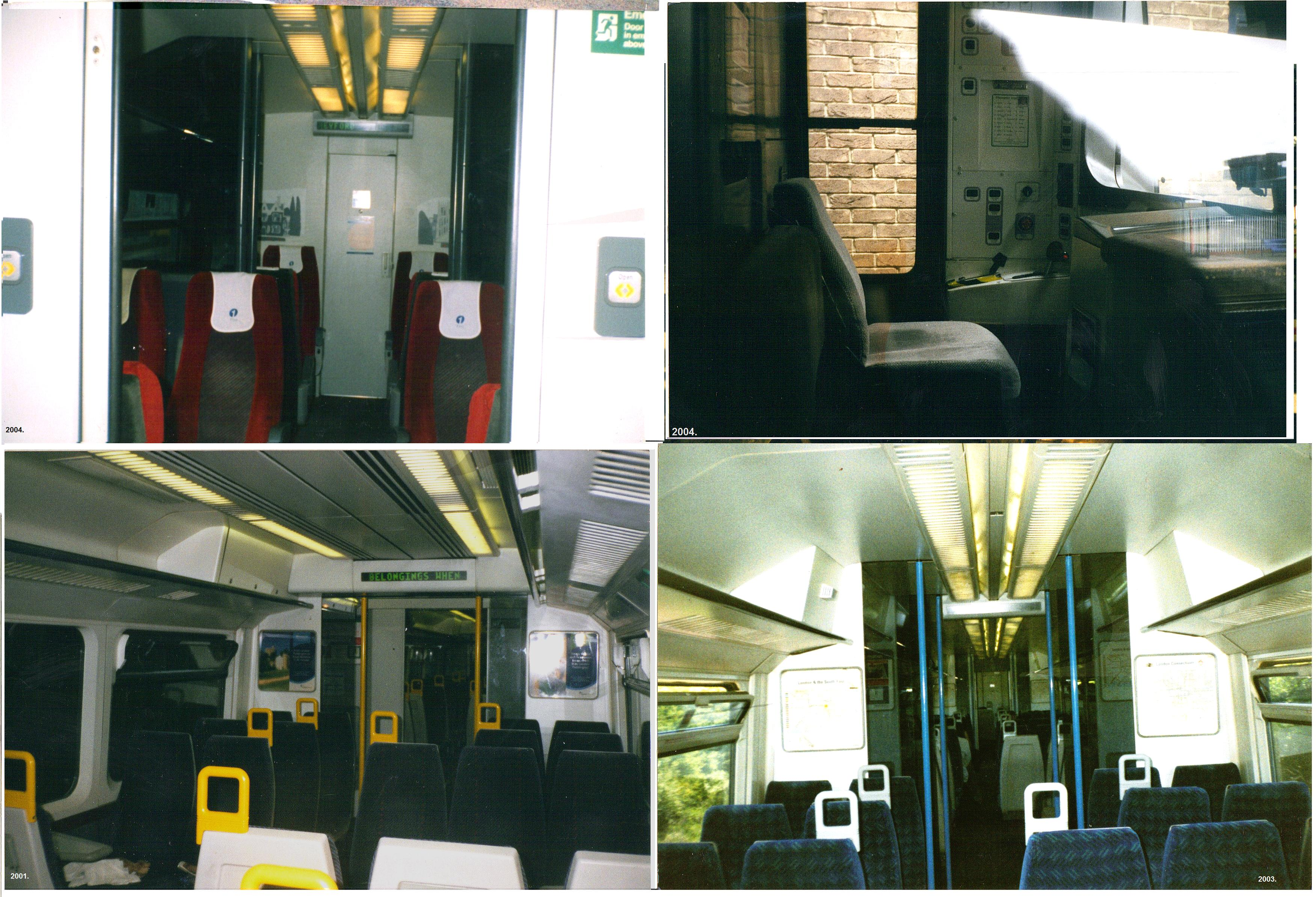
Pictures of various Thames Trains' Networker Turbos interiors and a cab shot are from 2000 to 2004 are of the following parts - (clockwise, from top left) 1st class, the driver's cab, 2nd class Class 166 seats and 2nd class Class 165 seats.

Thames Trains inherited a fleet of near-new Class 165 and Class 166 diesel multiple units from British Rail. Because the paintwork was still under warranty, the existing Network SouthEast livery was retained with only a Thames Trains logo added. Upon the warranty expiring, a new livery of white, blue and green was introduced in 2000.

Fleet at end of franchise
Class	Image	Type	Top speed		Number	Built
Class	Image	Type	mph	km/h	Number	Built
Class 165 Networker Turbo		DMU	90	145	36	1990–1992
Class 166 Networker Turbo		DMU	90	145	21	1992–1993

== Depot ==
Thames Trains' fleet was maintained at Reading TMD.

== Demise ==
In April 2003 the Strategic Rail Authority invited FirstGroup and Go-Ahead to bid for a two-year franchise until the end of the Thames franchise when it would become part of the Greater Western franchise. In November 2003 the Strategic Rail Authority awarded the new franchise to First with the services operated by Thames Trains transferring to First Great Western Link on 1 April 2004.

Preceded by Network SouthEast; As part of British Rail	Operator of Thames franchise 1996–2004	Succeeded by First Great Western Link
