= Networker Turbo =

Networker Turbo may refer to:

- British Rail Class 165, in service with both Chiltern Railways and Great Western Railway
- British Rail Class 166, a faster air conditioned variant of the 165 in service with Great Western Railway
- British Rail Class 168, a later partial derivative of the 165 in service with Chiltern Railways
