= Bristol Bath Road depot =

Former railway depot in Bristol, England

Bristol Bath Road TMD
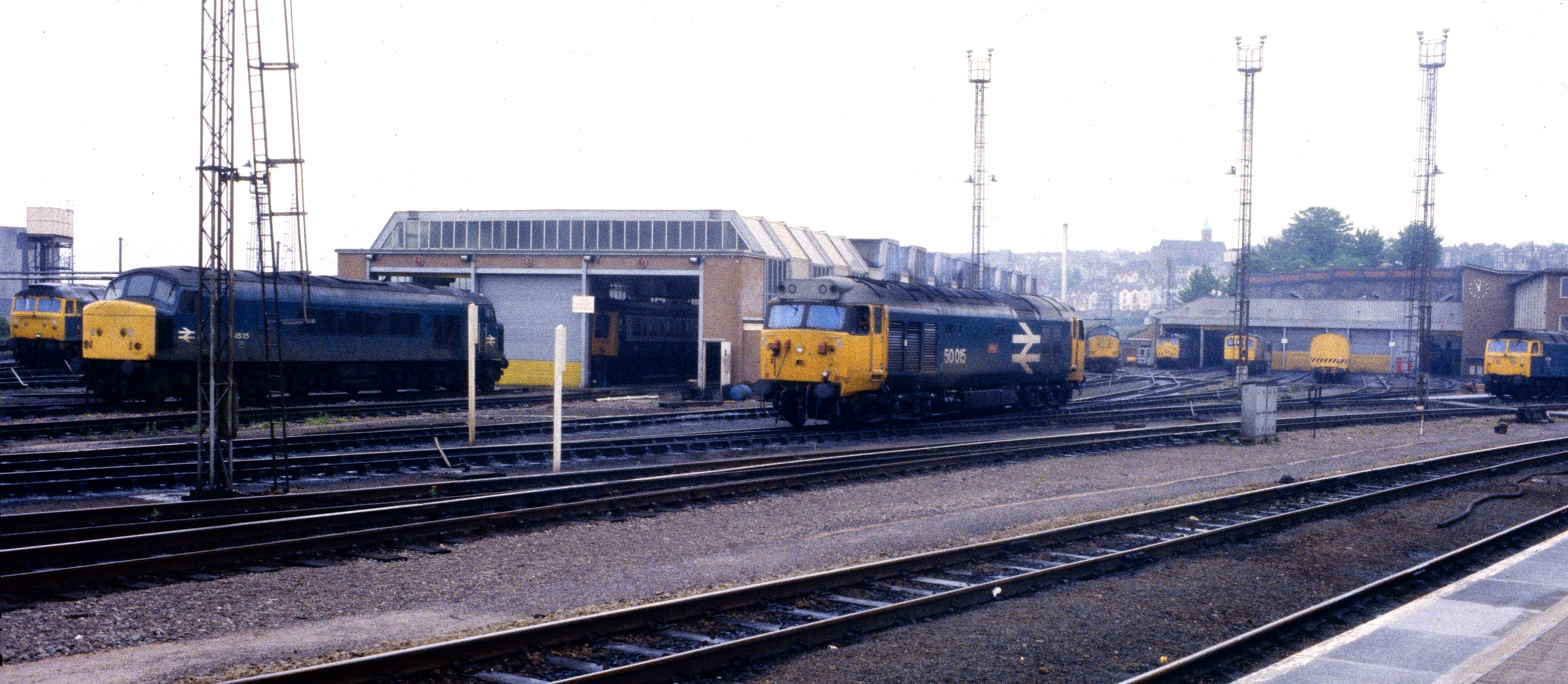
- Bristol Bath Road TMD in 1984
- Interactive map of Bristol Bath Road TMD

Location
- Location: Bristol, United Kingdom
- Coordinates: 51.4461°N 2.5792°W
- OS grid: SP870344

Characteristics
- Owner: Great Western Trains
- Depot code: 82A (1948–1973); BR (1973–1995)
- Type: Steam (1852-1960) and diesel

History
- Opened: 1852
- Closed: 1995
- Original: B&ER
- Pre-grouping: GWR
- Post-grouping: GWR

Bristol Bath Road depot was a railway traction maintenance depot in central Bristol, England, which was in use from 1852 until 1995.

== History ==
The Bristol and Exeter Railway opened workshops at Bath Road in January 1852. 35 locomotives were built in the workshops between 1859 and 1876. Part of the site was an engine shed with six tracks. It was rebuilt under the Loans and Guarantees Act (1929) in 1934 by the Great Western Railway. The site's scale meant that although the depot was to be the major repair and maintenance point for the Bristol divisional area, the shed was restricted to a steel-frame straight 8-road with northernlight roof pattern form, as opposed to the GWR standard-pattern turntable model like Old Oak Common. Secondly, as the depot was so close to Bristol Temple Meads, it was required to keep the depot in full operation while construction took place. The twin-ramp coal stage was of standard GWR pattern but used concrete beams and brick piers to restrict ramp width. The divisional repair shop was to the far north of the site, close to the River Avon. There were two 65-foot (20 m) standard-pattern over-girder turntables on site, one to the rear of the shed, and one to the northeast of the repair shop.

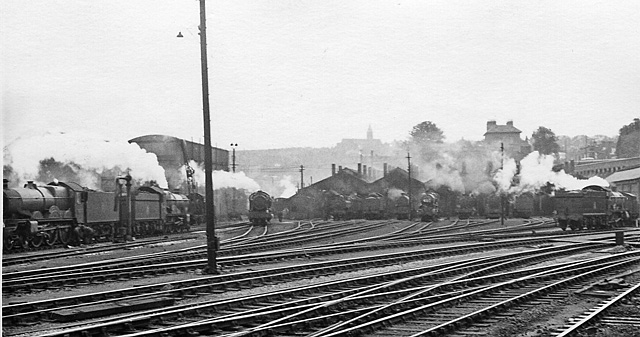
Bristol Bath Road depot under British Railways, 2 August 1958, as viewed from platform 2A of Bristol Temple Meads

While Bath Road handled passenger traffic locomotives, St Philip's Marsh depot on the eastern throat handled freight types. Post nationalisation, under British Railways both Bath Road (Code: BR) and St Philip's Marsh gained additional allocation from the closure of the local London Midland and Scottish Railway sheds. By 1950 it had an allocation of 93 locomotives, half of them classic GWR 4-6-0s, and most of the others 2-6-2Ts for running local and regional passenger traffic.

However, as it was located on a main national route, with an equally large-scale shed on the opposite throat of the station, Bath Road was one of the first sheds to be closed to steam locomotives from September 1960. Rebuilt as a diesel depot, it retained one of the turntables.

The depot ceased all operation on 28 September 1995, when its last operator Great Western Trains transferred all operations to St Philip's Marsh T&RSMD.

== Modern redevelopment ==
In 2011, the railway-level depot site was named as part of the 70-hectare (170-acre) Bristol Temple Quarter Enterprise Zone, where reduced taxes and planning controls would encourage development of new businesses. It was hoped that around 40 businesses would provide employment for 4,000 people within five years. The site was also considered to become the location for the Bristol Arena, a new 12,000 seater entertainment venue, with construction expected to start in late 2016 and set to open in 2018. Development of the Arena was repeatedly delayed, and at the end of 2018 the plans to build it here were dropped; the future for the site remains unclear.
