= British Rail Class 165 =

British diesel multiple-unit passenger trains

British Rail Class 165 Networker Turbo
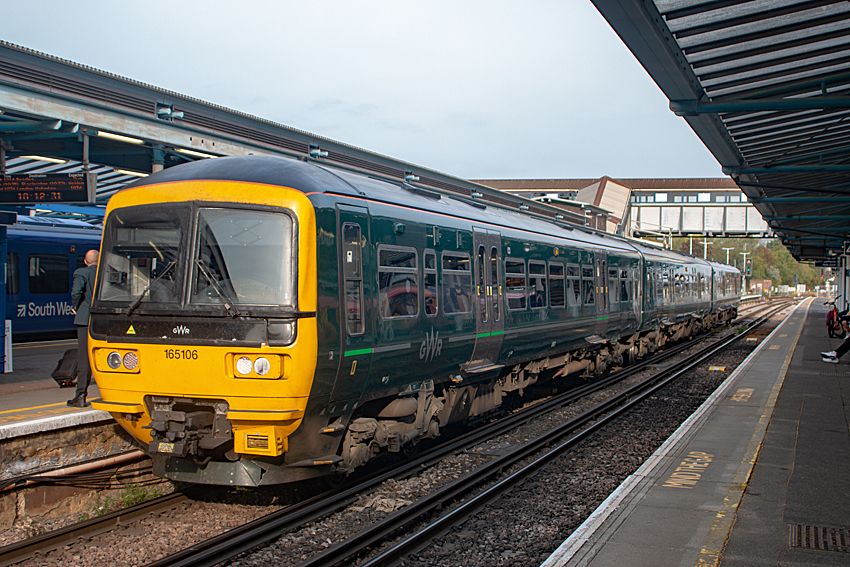
- Great Western Railway Class 165 at Guildford

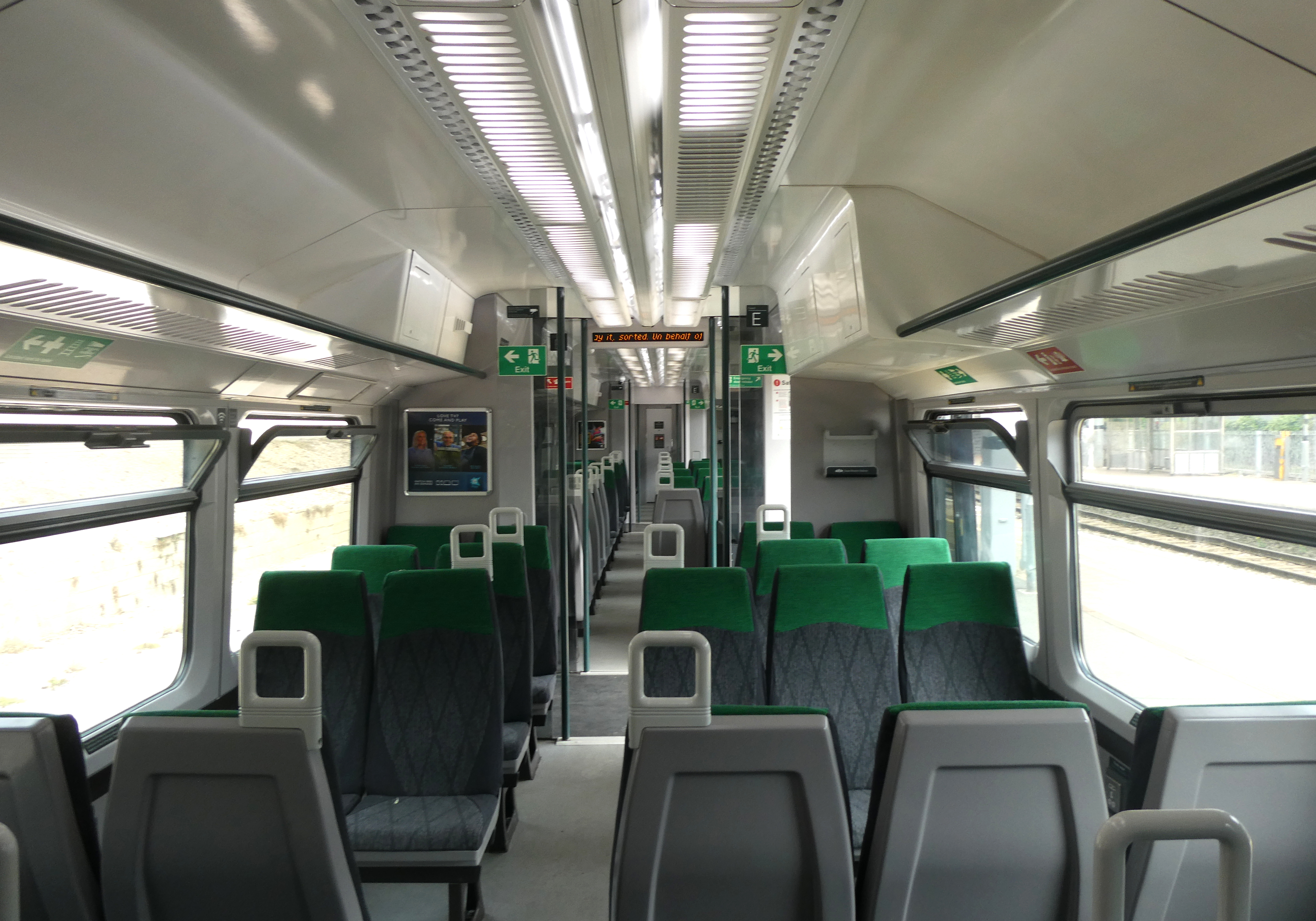
- Refreshed GWR Class 165 standard-class saloon
- In service: 10 September 1991 – present
- Manufacturer: British Rail Engineering Limited
- Built at: Holgate Road Works, York
- Family name: Networker Turbo
- Replaced: Class 104; Class 115; Class 117; Class 119
- Constructed: 1990–1992
- Refurbished: 2003–2005 (165/0); 2010–2012 (165/1)
- Number built: 76 (39 × 165/0, 37 × 165/1)
- Number in service: 75
- Number scrapped: 1
- Formation: 2-car units: DMCL-DMS; 3-car units: DMCL-MS-DMS
- Fleet numbers: 165/0: 165001–165039; 165/1: 165101–165137
- Capacity: 2-car units: 186 seats (16 first-, 170 standard-class); 3-car units: 288 seats (24 first-, 264 standard-class)
- Owner: Angel Trains
- Operators: Chiltern Railways; Great Western Railway
- Lines served: Great Western Main Line; Chiltern Main Line; Severn Beach Line; Golden Valley Line; Wessex Main Line; Heart of Wessex Line; Avocet Line; Riviera Line; Tarka Line; Dartmoor Line; Henley branch line

Specifications
- Car body construction: Welded aluminium
- Car length: DM vehs.: 23.50 m (77 ft 1 in); MS vehs.: 23.25 m (76 ft 3 in)
- Width: 2.81 m (9 ft 3 in)
- Height: 3.79 m (12 ft 5 in)
- Doors: Double-leaf sliding plug (2 per side per car)
- Maximum speed: 165/0: 75 mph (121 km/h); 165/1: 90 mph (145 km/h)
- Axle load: Route Availability 1
- Prime mover: 2 or 3 × Perkins 2006 TW-H (one per vehicle)
- Engine type: Inline-6 4-stroke turbo-diesel
- Displacement: 12.2 L (742.64 cu in) per engine
- Power output: 260 kW (350 hp) per engine
- Transmission: Voith T 211 rz (hydrokinetic, one per vehicle)
- UIC classification: 2-car: 2′B′+B′2′; 3-car: 2′B′+2′B′+B′2′
- Bogies: Powered: BREL P3-17; Unpowered: BREL T3-17
- Braking system: Electro-pneumatic (disc)
- Safety systems: AWS; BR ATP (165/0 only); TPWS; Tripcock (165/0 only)
- Coupling system: BSI
- Multiple working: Within class, and with Classes 166 and 168
- Track gauge: 1,435 mm (4 ft 8 1/2 in) standard gauge

Notes/references
- Sourced from except where otherwise noted.

The British Rail Class 165 Networker Turbo is a fleet of suburban diesel-hydraulic multiple unit passenger trains (DMUs), originally specified by and built for the British Rail Thames and Chiltern Division of Network SouthEast. They were built by BREL York Works between 1990 and 1992. An express version was subsequently built in the form of the Class 166 Networker Turbo Express trains. Both classes are now referred to as "Networker Turbos", a name derived some three years later for the project that resulted in the related Class 365 and Class 465 EMUs.

The class is still in service, now operated by Great Western Railway and by Chiltern Railways. When operated originally by Network SouthEast, along with that operator's Class 166 trains, the Paddington suburban units were initially known as Thames Turbos, while the units operated on the Marylebone suburban network were known as Chiltern Turbos.

== Description ==
Externally, the class 165 can be distinguished from a Class 166 by the opening hoppers on every other window.

=== Class 165/0 ===
Thirty-nine Class 165/0 Networker trains were built in 1990–91, in two batches, for the Chiltern subdivision of Network SouthEast, numbered 165001–039. Both 2-car and 3-car variants were built. Initially, thirty-three units were ordered (comprising the vehicles that made up units 165001-165022 and 165029–165039) but an additional order was placed for a further six units (165023-028). Units 165001-028 were delivered consecutively, as 2-car units, whilst units 165029-039 were delivered as 3-car units. These vehicles have a top speed of 75 mph (121 km/h). They are now all fitted with tripcocks for working over the London Underground lines between Amersham and Harrow-on-the-Hill, although upon delivery this equipment was only fitted to 165006–028. Automatic Train Protection is also fitted, making them one of the few classes to have both these features in Britain.

Each unit was formed of two outer driving motors, with an additional intermediate motor in the 3-car units. The technical description of the formation is DMOSL+MOS+DMOS. Individual carriages are numbered as follows:

- 58801-58833 (units 165001-022/029-039) and 58873-58878 (units 165023–028) - DMOSL
- 55404-55414 (units 165029–039) - MOS
- 58834-58866 (units 165001-022/029-039) and 58867-58872 (units 165023–028) - DMOS

=== Class 165/1 ===
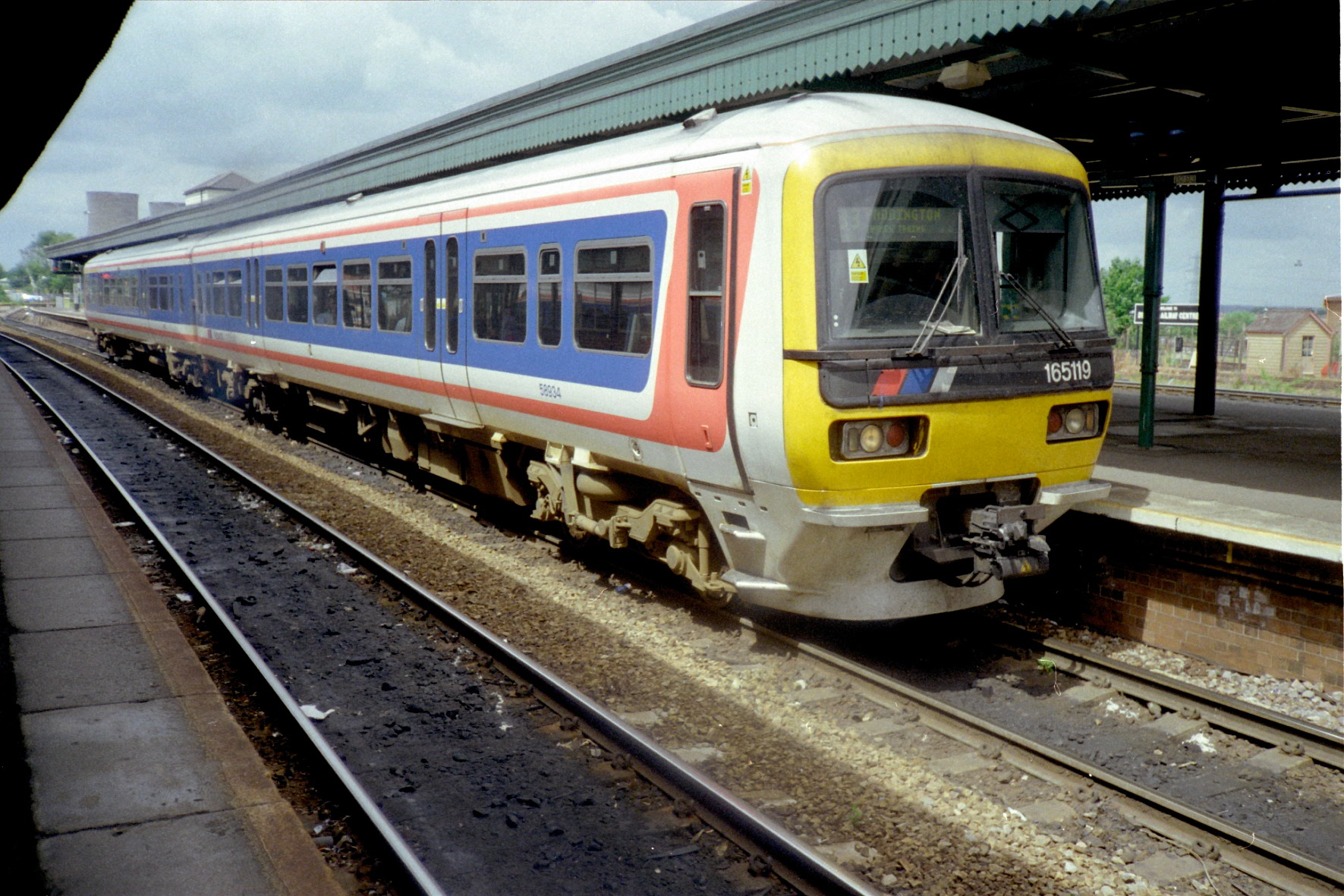
No.165119 at Didcot Parkway. This unit is painted in the original Network SouthEast livery.

Thirty-seven Class 165/1 Networker trains were built in 1992 for the Thames line subdivision of Network SouthEast, numbered 165101–137. Like the Chiltern units, both 2-car and 3-car variants were built. Units 165101-117 were delivered as 3-car units, followed by the 2-car units 165118–137. They are regeared and fitted with bogie yaw dampers to allow a top speed of 90 mph (145 km/h), more suitable for mainline use.

Each unit was formed of two outer driving motors, with an additional intermediate motor in the 3-car units. The technical description of the formation is DMOCL+MOS+DMOS. Although still listed on the vehicle data sheets at DMCL vehicles, the first-class area has been removed from 2-car 165s operated by GWR. As such these vehicles are now technically DMOSL vehicles. The 3-car units were similarly declassified, but the first-class accommodation has now been reinstated on these. Individual carriages are numbered as follows:

- 58953-58969 - DMCL
- 58879-58898 - DMOSL changed from DMCL in 2015
- 55415-55431 - MOS
- 58916-58932 and 58933-58952 - DMOS

Unit 165115 was destroyed in the Ladbroke Grove rail crash.

== Accidents and incidents ==
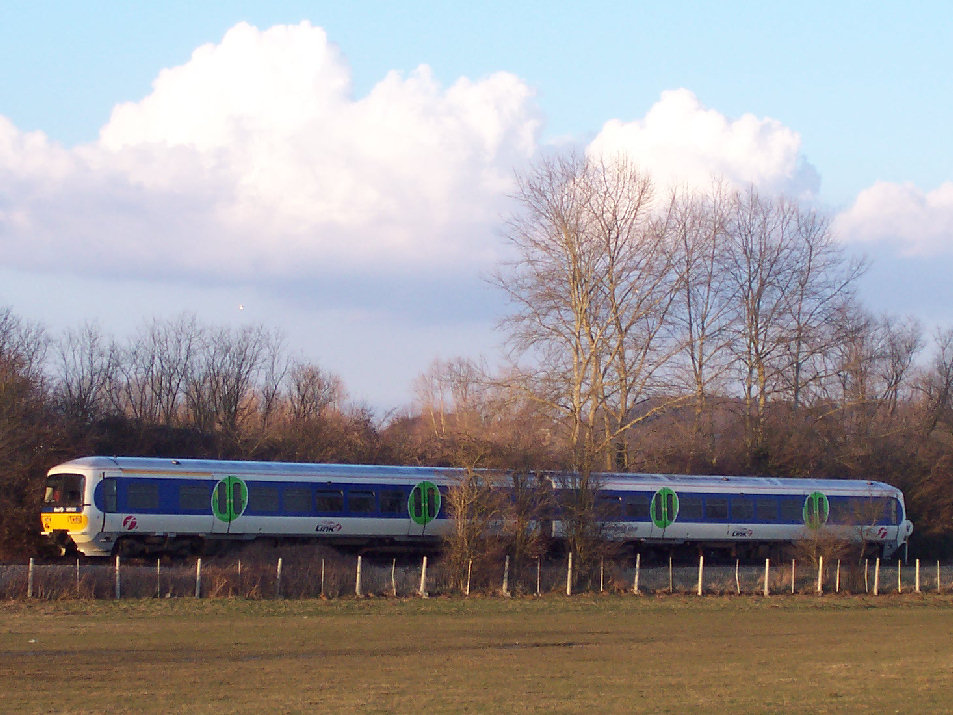
A Class 165 in First Great Western Link livery on the Marlow Branch Line.

- On 2 November 1994, unit 165102 collided with the buffer stop at Slough and damaged part of the station after it slid for 1,200 yd (1,100 m) due to slippery rails. It only reduced its speed from 56mph to 30mph upon impact, injuring two people. An inquiry found that had the train not hit the buffers it would have continued sliding for a further 910 yd (830 m) before stopping.
- Ladbroke Grove rail crash: On 5 October 1999, unit 165115 passed a signal at danger while leaving London Paddington on a Thames Trains service. This resulted in a serious collision with a London-bound HST service. 31 people were killed (24 of them on board the Class 165, the leading coach of which was completely destroyed by the impact) and 417 were injured.
- On 30 June 2005, unit 165037 was approaching the Gerrards Cross Tunnel, which was under construction, when the driver realised that the line was blocked. An emergency stop was made and the train came to a halt 250 to 300 yards (230 to 270 m) before the tunnel, which had partially collapsed. The train returned wrong line to Denham Golf Club where the passengers were detrained.
- On 16 June 2016, unit 165124 was derailed by a set of trap points at Paddington after passing a signal at danger, causing significant disruption to services. The driver's assistant's side of the cab was destroyed after the train hit a stanchion that holds up the overhead catenary after derailing. The vehicle was moved after two days in position at Paddington to Old Oak Common Depot to be taken away by road for assessment and repair work.
- Unit 165128 was in service as a hybrid unit with 58609 (MOS vehicle from 166209) inserted in the middle from November 2015 until May 2016. This was due to one of its driving vehicles being damaged in an engine fire on the North Downs line in November 2015, rendering it out of service, and so to provide another 3-car train in service.
- On 21 June 2020, units 165015 and 165006 formed a passenger train that passed a signal at danger (a SPAD) and was in danger of colliding head-on with a passenger train formed of London Underground S stock at Chalfont & Latimer. The two trains stopped 25 yards (23 m) apart. Driver fatigue was found to be the cause of the SPAD.

== Operations ==
=== Chiltern Railways ===
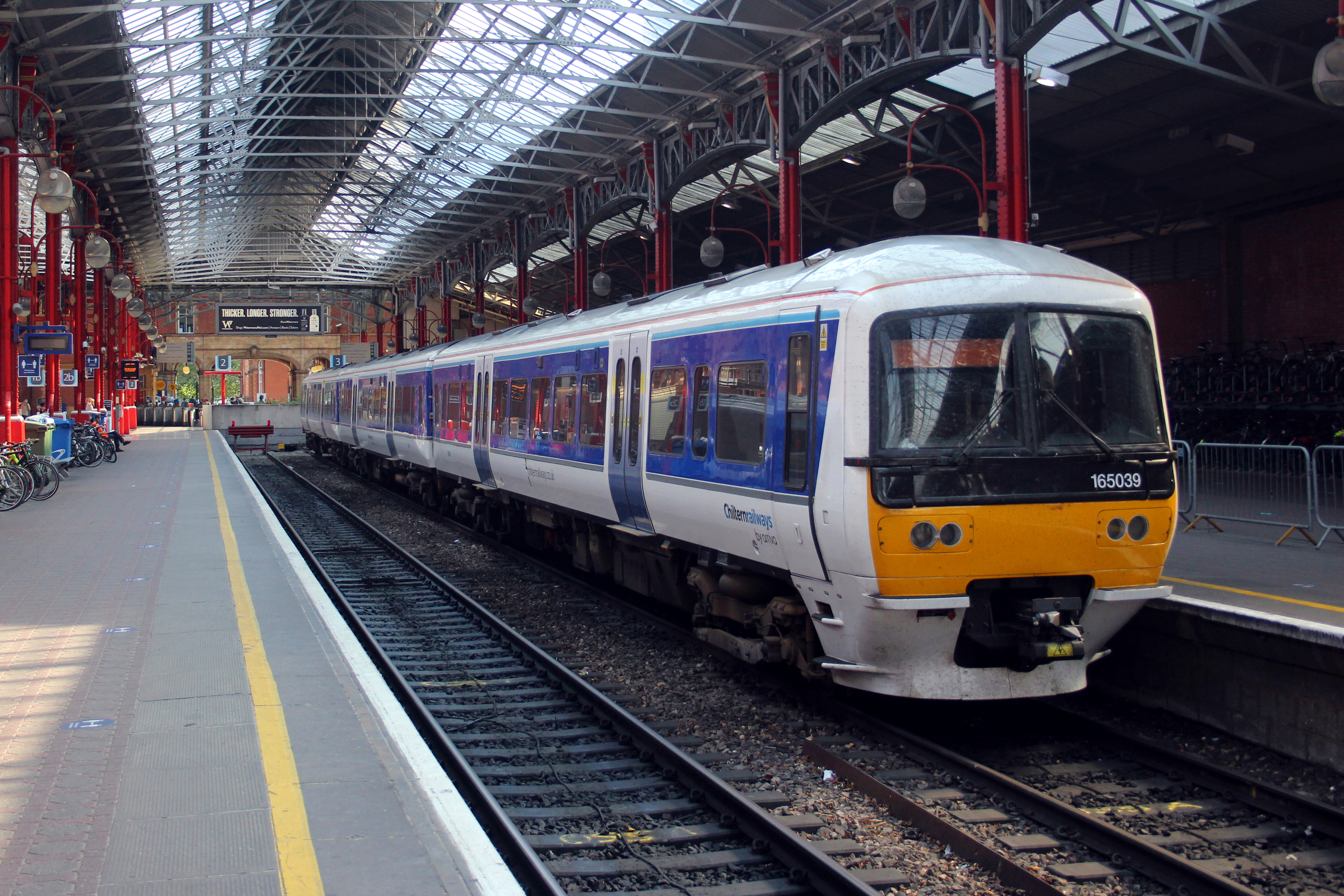
165039 in revised Chiltern Railways livery at London Marylebone.

The 165/0 units were originally delivered in Network SouthEast livery for used on routes including fast services from London Marylebone to Princes Risborough and Banbury and local services from Aylesbury to London and Princes Risborough. In this role they replaced the Class 115 DMUs. They were later used further afield, when Chiltern services were extended to serve Leamington Spa, Warwick, Solihull and Birmingham Snow Hill / Birmingham Moor Street railway station.

In December 1993, due to a downturn in traffic as a result of the recession, units 165001-007 were transferred from the Chiltern lines of Network SouthEast to the Thames lines (from Aylesbury to Reading depots). All vehicles had their tripcock equipment removed before transfer. The following year, unit 165007 was returned to the Chiltern lines, followed by 165006 in 1995. Due to unavailability of tripcock equipment upon their return, the units were coupled cab-to-cab and operated for some months between the vehicles of other units as semi-permanently formed four-car units - until tripcock equipment became available, allowing them to be restored to operational two-car units. Following privatisation, two former Chiltern units (165003 and 165005) were repainted into Thames Trains livery. Chiltern Railways inherited 34 Class 165/0 units from Network SouthEast, and the remaining five were returned from Thames Trains in 2004 - leaving Chiltern Railways operating the whole subclass.

After privatisation they continued to work similar services as before but, with the arrival of the faster Class 168 Clubman units, the 165 Turbo trains were displaced and are now found less often on expresses to Birmingham, generally working on shorter routes such as stopping services to Aylesbury, High Wycombe, and Stratford-upon-Avon and also the Birmingham Moor Street - Leamington Spa local services.

A new depot was built at Aylesbury in 1990/1991 for the maintenance of these trains and has been enlarged since British Rail days, with the addition of a wheel lathe. Light maintenance and refuelling is carried out at Wembley LMD and Tyseley TMD, and units can occasionally be found at Stourbridge LMD. Units are also regularly stabled in the Marylebone station environs, Aylesbury South Sidings and at Banbury, where a further depot is currently under construction at the south end of the station on the western side of the line.

All Chiltern units were refurbished between late 2003 and early 2005. Air conditioning was added and the opening hopper windows replaced with sealed units. A new passenger information system, similar to that on the Class 168 Clubman trains, CCTV cameras and an area designated for the use of wheelchair users were added and the first-class section was removed, as Chiltern became a standard-class-only railway in 2003. The original 3+2 seating at the outer ends of the driving vehicles was replaced by new 2+2 high-back seating. The existing 3+2 low-back seating was retained in the centre areas of the driving vehicles and throughout the centre vehicles of the three-car units. A cycle/wheelchair area with tip-up seats was also added to each unit. A further refurbishment began in 2015, concentrating on the toilet areas, to make these units fully Disability Discrimination Act 1995 (DDA)-compliant for operation beyond 2020.

They can often be found on the Aylesbury to London Marylebone routes including the Princes Risborough shuttle.

=== Great Western Railway ===
==== Thames Valley ====
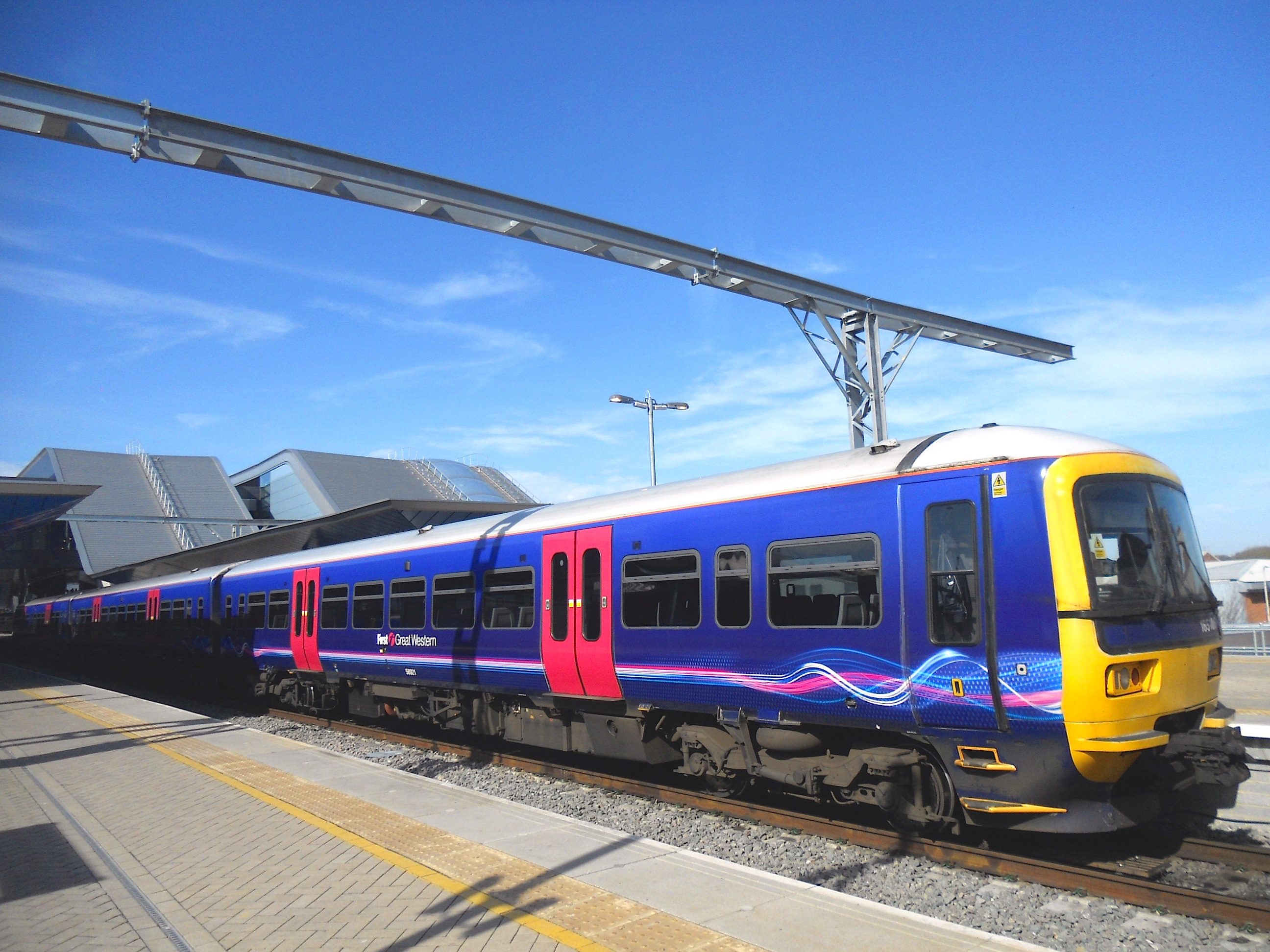
First Great Western Class 165/1 No. 165106 at Reading

The Class 165/1 fleet were built for local services from London Paddington along the Great Western Main Line; their main destinations included local trains to Reading, Greenford, Newbury, Bedwyn, Oxford, and Banbury, and services along the branch lines to Windsor & Eton Central, Henley-on-Thames, Marlow and Bicester Town.

Following the privatisation of British Rail, the franchise was won by the Go-Ahead Group, who operated it as Thames Trains from 1996 to 2004 and inherited all the Class 165/1 Turbo trains as well as the first five Class 165/0 Turbo trains that had been transferred from the Chiltern lines. In April 2004, operation of the Thames Trains franchise passed to First Great Western Link. In 2004, due to deliveries of new Class 180 Adelante units on sister company First Great Western, the five Class 165/0 Turbo units became redundant and were transferred to Chiltern Railways.

In January 2010, First Great Western announced an £8 million refurbishment programme for its fleet of Classes 165 and 166 Turbo DMU trains:

- seats re-trimmed
- interiors repainted
- Passenger Information Displays replaced with a GPS-based system
- upgraded lavatory facilities
- flooring stripped and replaced

In 2012, First Great Western took delivery of Class 180 Adelante units for Cotswold Line services, and three-car Class 150 Sprinter units for Reading to Basingstoke Line services, allowing Class 165 and 166 units to be used to reinforce Thames Valley services.

In late 2015, as part of the rebranding to GWR, the Class 165 fleet had all first-class sections removed to increase capacity.

Following the electrification of the Great Western Main Line up to Didcot Parkway, as well as the Reading-Taunton line as far as Newbury, services between London Paddington and Didcot Parkway, as well as between Reading and Newbury, have been operated by new Class 387 electric multiple units, allowing much of the existing Class 165 fleet to move to the Bristol area. Class 165s continue to service the aforementioned branch lines, but no longer run to London Paddington except during peak hours.

==== Bristol area ====
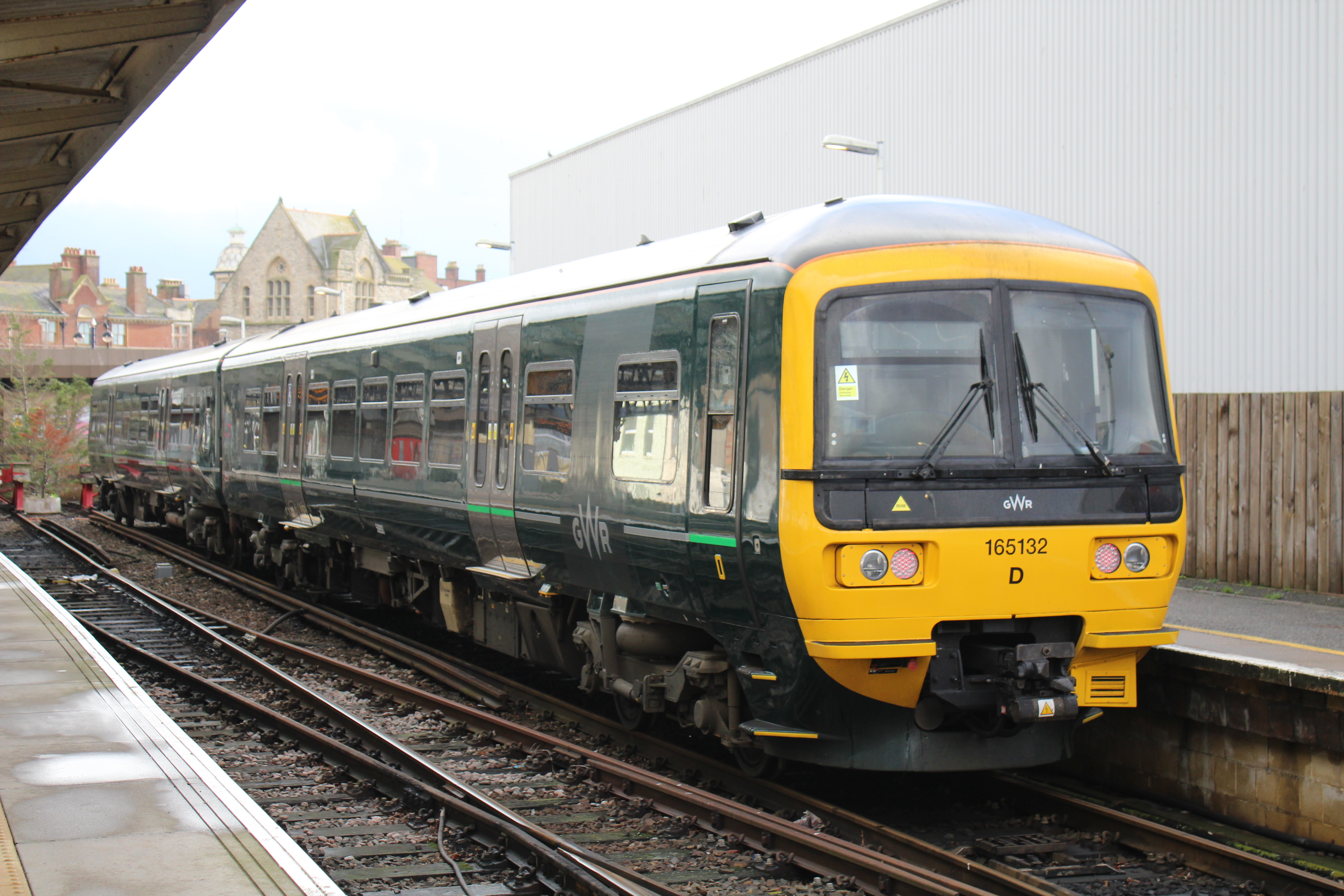
165132 at Weymouth after arrival from Gloucester. The unit has lettered coaches, with coach D being displayed.

Following the transfer of the 166 units to St Philip's Marsh depot in July 2017, some of the 165 services have since followed on with the first 165 operating in the Bristol area in July 2018. Since then and alongside the 166s, they have rapidly been introduced on other services such as the Weston-super-Mare to Filton Abbey Wood (now Weston-super-Mare / Bristol Temple Meads to Severn Beach / Filton Abbey Wood) services, the Cardiff Central to Taunton services, the Golden Valley Line, the Heart of Wessex Line and also some services on the Wessex Main Line as far as Warminster and Southampton Central. In January 2019, they began operating the regional service between Cardiff Central and Portsmouth Harbour which allowed more of the Class 158 units that solely operated this service to move more west.

The transfer of the 165 (and 166) units to services in and around Bristol and Exeter have overall allowed units that previously operated these services to move further west, such as the Class 150 and Class 158 units. More so than the 166 units, a lot of the 165 units remain to be based at Reading TMD where they continue to operate Thames Valley services.

== Fleet details ==
Class	Operator	Qty.	Year built	Cars per unit	Unit nos.	Notes
165/0	Chiltern Railways	28	1990–1991	2	165001–165028	165004 fitted with hybrid powertrain
165/0	Chiltern Railways	11	1990–1991	3	165029–165039	
165/1	Great Western Railway	16	1992	3	165101–165114, 165116–165117	
165/1	Great Western Railway	20	1992	2	165118–165137	
165/1	Scrapped	1	1992	3	165115	Destroyed in the Ladbroke Grove rail crash.

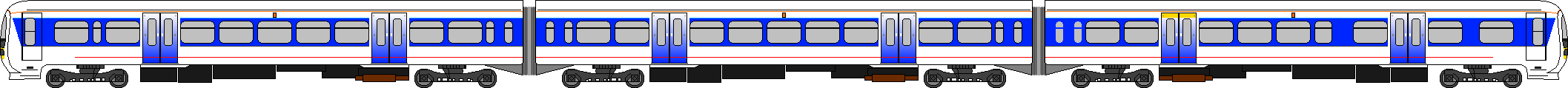
Chiltern Railways 3-car Class 165/0 unit

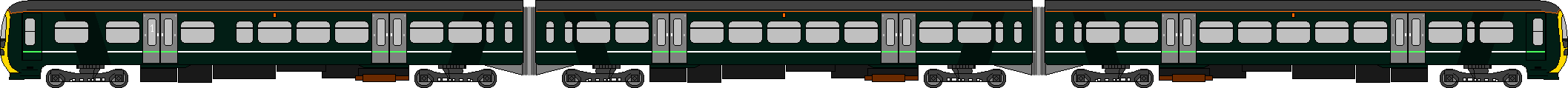
Great Western Railway 3-car Class 165/1 unit

== Named units ==
Some units have been named these are as follows:

- 165119 Norman Topsom MBE
- 165120 Roger Watkins The GWR master train planner

== Hybrid powertrain ==
It was reported in September 2018 that Angel Trains was to convert class 165 units for Chiltern Railways to hybrid diesel and battery-powered trains.

In April 2020, two-car unit 165004 was sent to LORAM rail at Derby for HyDrive conversion.

In August 2023 it was announced that the project had been abandoned.
