= St Philip's Marsh depot =

Railway maintenance depot in Bristol, England

St Philip's Marsh TMD
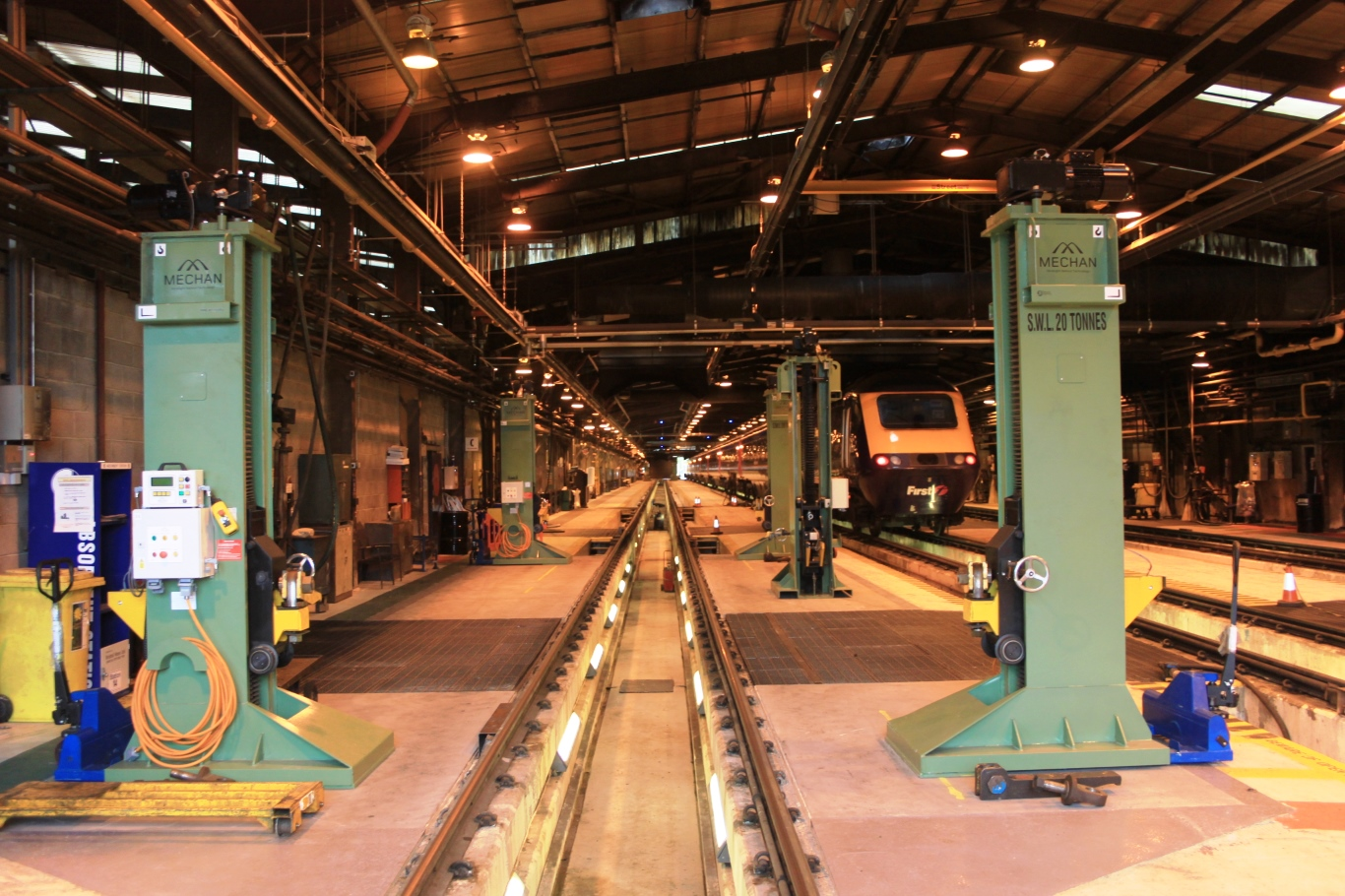
- An InterCity 125 inside the HST shed
- Interactive map of St Philip's Marsh TMD

Location
- Location: Bristol, England
- Coordinates: 51.4468°N 2.5657°W
- OS grid: ST607722

Characteristics
- Depot code: BJ (1973-); PM (1973-)
- Type: DMU

History
- Former depot code: SPM; 82B (1948-1964)

St Philip's Marsh depot is a railway depot located in the St Philip's Marsh district of Bristol, England. It is owned by Network Rail and operated by Great Western Railway to maintain its regional diesel multiple units.

The depot was established as a steam locomotive shed in 1910, but this facility closed in the 1960s. A new diesel facility opened nearby at Marsh Junction in 1959. This was combined with a new shed which was opened in 1976 to maintain InterCity 125 trainsets.

== History ==
=== St. Phillip's Marsh steam shed ===
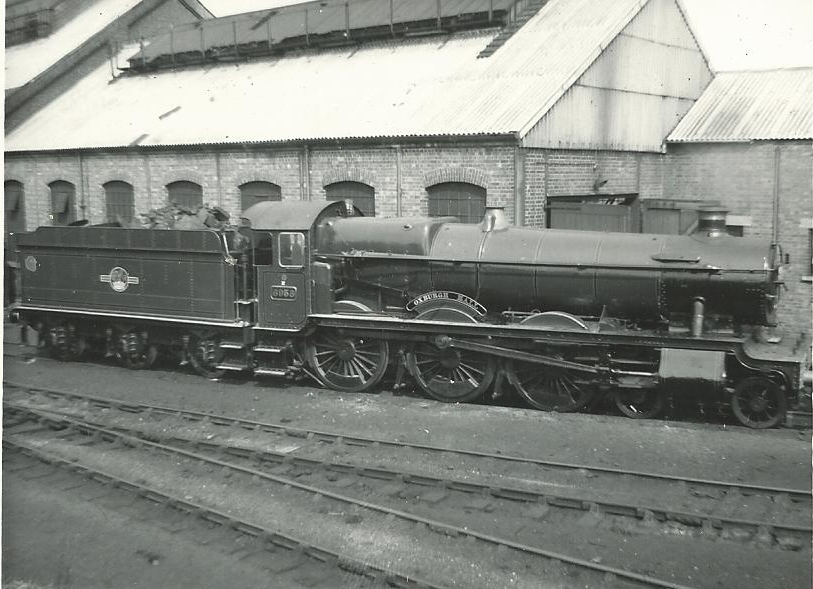
6958 Oxburgh Hall outside the steam shed

Bristol Temple Meads was the western terminus for the Great Western Railway (GWR) from London Paddington. The initial small locomotive service facilities expanded as other railway lines were opened. After the GWR absorbed the Bristol and Exeter Railway in 1876, the latter's workshops at Bristol Bath Road, which were adjacent to Temple Meads station, became the principal GWR locomotive repair and maintenance facility in the area.

In July 1910 a new shed was opened at St Philip's Marsh alongside a line which allowed through trains to avoid going through Bristol Temple Meads station. This new shed was mainly allocated freight locomotives including 0-6-0 Pannier Tanks which plied their trade mainly in either Bristol Docks or at Avonmouth. Bath Road, which could not expand due to the proximity of the River Avon, now serviced mostly passenger train locomotives

St Philip's Marsh shed was constructed to Churchward's standard design with two-turntables and a north light roof. The layout allowed for two additional turntables to the rear of the structure should they be required. Based on the pattern design set by Old Oak Common, the rail level was 30 feet (9.1 m) above general ground level with the shed foundations sat on concrete piles. 28 roads radiated from each 65-foot (20 m) turntable, each road having its own inspection pit. There was a standard pattern twin-ramp coaling stage, but the repair shop was only a small two-road building, due to the closeness of Bristol (Bath Road). A boiler washing plant was added in 1924, and ash shelters during World War II.

After 1948 and under Western Region of British Railways control, both Bath Road (82A) and St Philip's Marsh (82B) gained additional locomotives following the closure of the local London Midland and Scottish Railway sheds. St Philip's Marsh closed to steam in June 1964. The locomotive sheds were subsequently demolished and the site disconnected from the rail network west of Albert Crescent by the 1970s. The site of the locomotive sheds has been redeveloped as a fruit market.

=== Marsh Junction depot ===
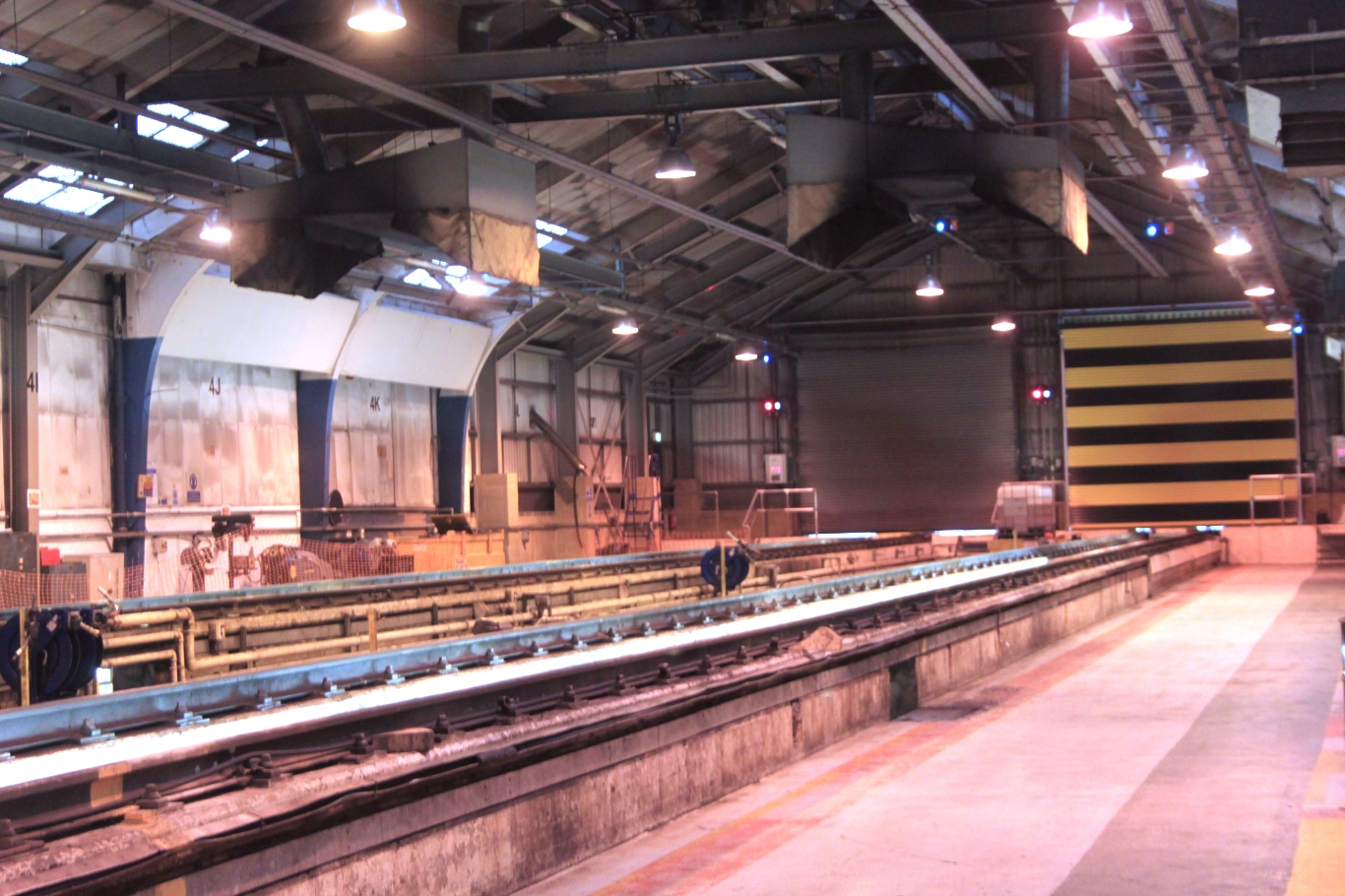
Inside Marsh junction DMU shed

A four-road diesel depot was opened in 1959. Diesel locomotives were serviced at Bath Road depot after it was rebuilt a few years later but diesel multiple units (DMUs) continued to be serviced here. From 1970 the depot was used for maintaining permanent way plant and most DMU work was transferred to Bath Road.

Half of the shed was extended 15 m (49 ft) in 2006 to give two roads long enough to accommodate three-car 23-metre (75 ft) DMUs to be maintained (in 1959 DMU cars were only 20 metres (66 ft) long).

==== Philips Marsh HST depot ====
A site north of the Avoiding Line was used for the construction of a new maintenance shed 250 m (800 ft) west of Marsh Junction depot. This opened in 1976 and had three roads, each capable of holding an entire InterCity 125 (or HST) trainset under cover. Open air sidings were available opposite the site of the old steam shed.

The site was used for the maintenance of their InterCity 125 trains which operated between London Paddington, Bristol and South Wales. Both Class 43 power cars and Mark 3 coaching stock were serviced here. It was also used to maintain their fleet of British Rail Class 150 Sprinter DMUs which had previously been maintained (for the Wessex Trains franchise) at Cardiff Canton. In 2006, First Great Western created a new maintenance shed adjacent to the HST sheds, and upgrading other site facilities, at a cost of £8million.

The Intercity Express Programme to replace HSTs on express routes saw construction of the Stoke Gifford depot in 2016 to maintain the new fleet, and maintenance of intercity trains at St Philip's Marsh ceased in 2019. While shortened HST sets remained in service on regional routes for several more years, these were maintained at the Laira depot in Plymouth.

== Present ==
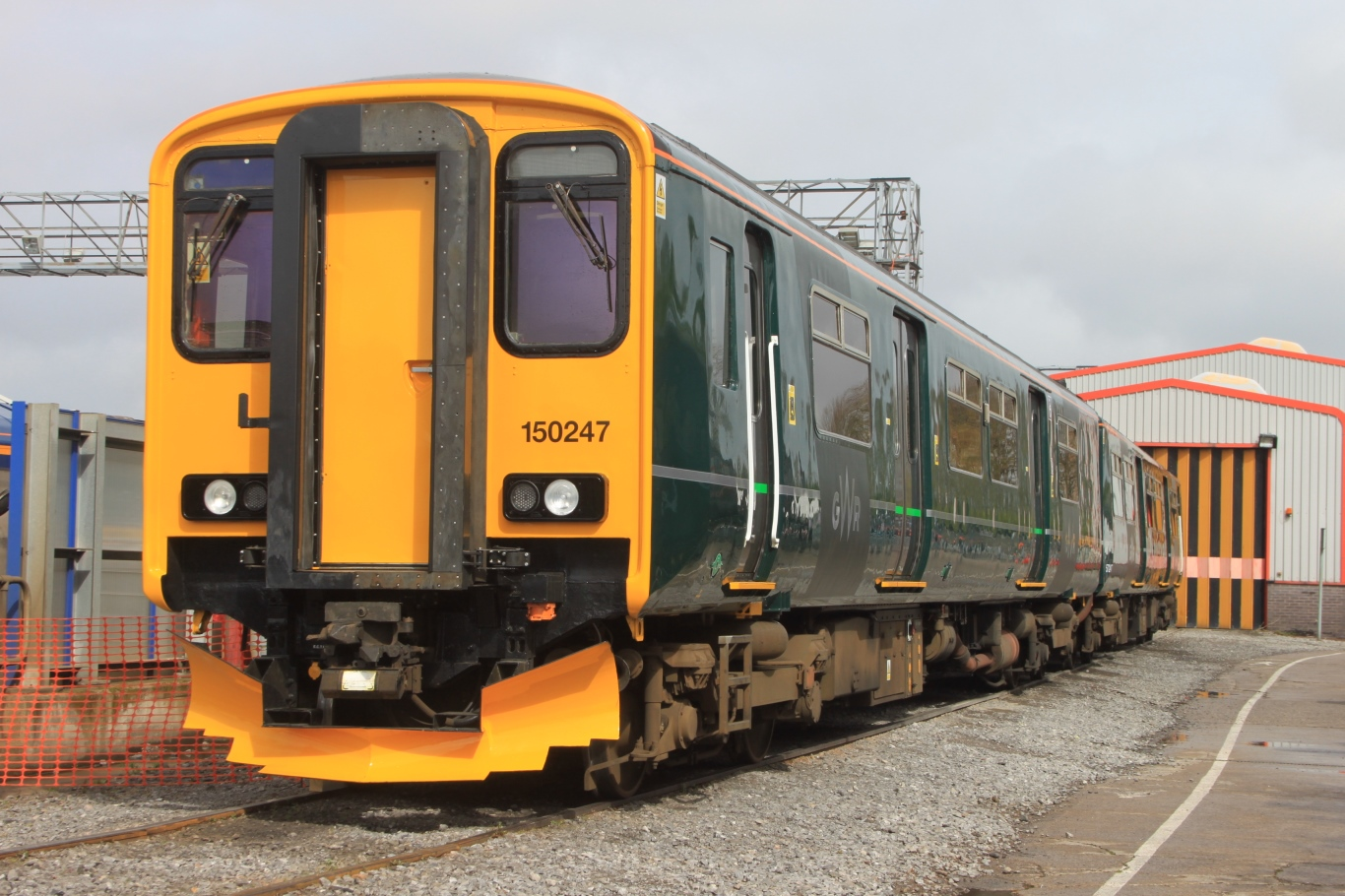
GWR 150247 outside the wheel lathe at Marsh Junction

St Philip's Marsh T&RSMD is owned by Network Rail, operating under code PM, and leased to the present-day Great Western Railway. Currently, St Philip's Marsh maintains the Class 158, Class 165 and Class 166 fleets used on the regional routes through Bristol.
