= British Rail Class 166 =

British diesel multiple-unit passenger trains

British Rail Class 166 Networker Turbo
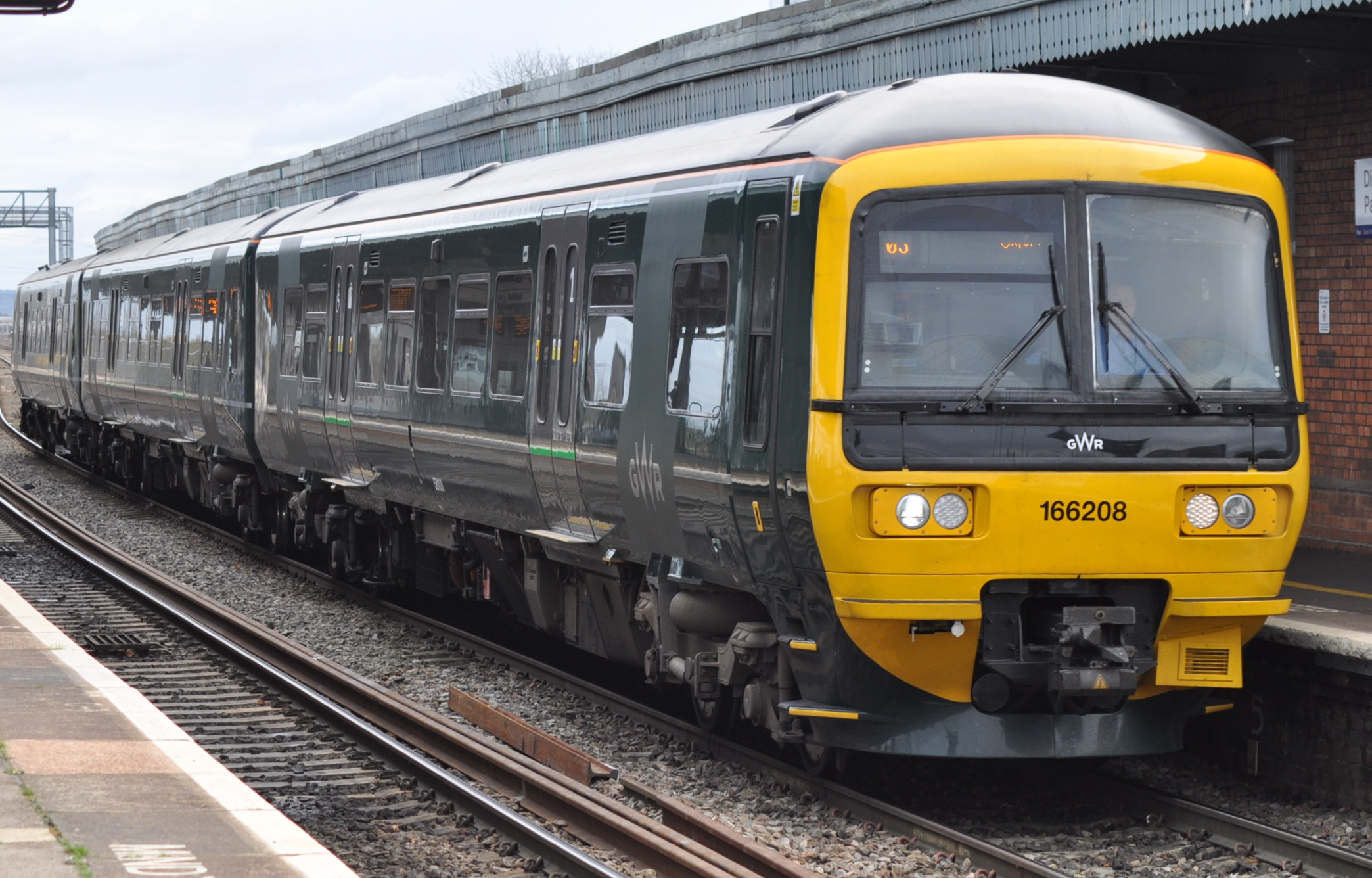
- Great Western Railway Class 166 at Didcot Parkway in 2015

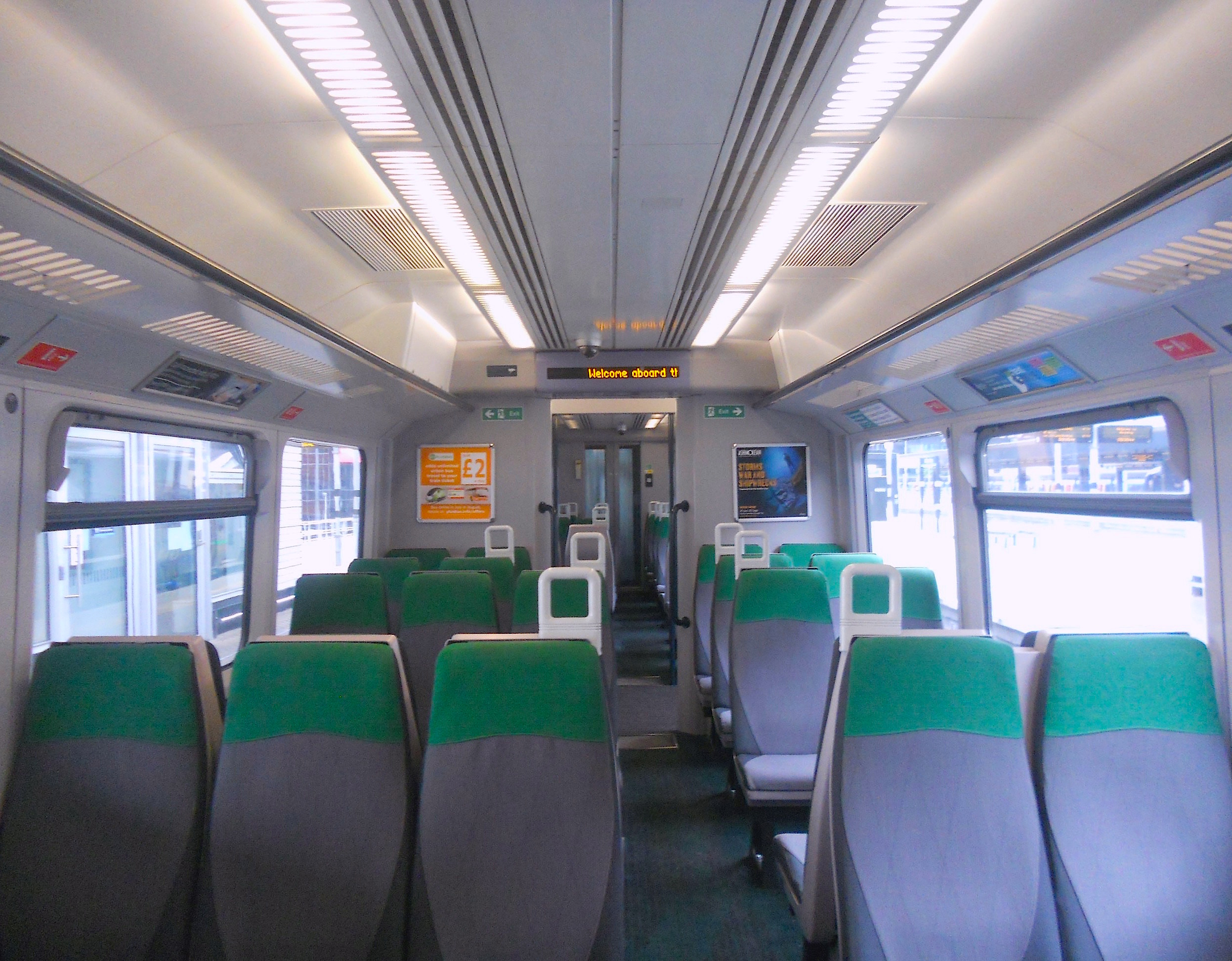
- Refurbished standard-class saloon
- In service: 11 May 1993 – present
- Manufacturer: ABB Transportation
- Built at: Holgate Road Works, York
- Family name: Networker Turbo
- Replaced: Class 117; Class 119; Class 121; Locomotive-hauled trains
- Constructed: 1992–1993
- Number in service: 21
- Formation: 3 cars per unit: DMCL-MS-DMSL
- Fleet numbers: 166201–166221
- Owner: Angel Trains
- Operator: Great Western Railway
- Depot: St Philip's Marsh (Bristol)
- Lines served: Severn Beach Line; Golden Valley line; Heart of Wessex Line; Wessex Main Line; Avocet Line; Riviera Line; Tarka Line; Dartmoor Line; Henley branch line

Specifications
- Car body construction: Welded aluminium
- Car length: DM vehs.: 23.50 m (77 ft 1 in); MS vehs.: 23.25 m (76 ft 3 in)
- Width: 2.81 m (9 ft 3 in)
- Doors: Double-leaf sliding plug (2 per side per car)
- Maximum speed: 90 mph (145 km/h)
- Prime mover: 3 × Perkins 2006 TW-H (one per vehicle)
- Engine type: Inline-6 4-stroke turbo-diesel
- Displacement: 12.2 L (742.64 cu in) per engine
- Power output: 260 kW (350 hp) per engine
- Transmission: Voith T 211 rz (hydrokinetic, one per vehicle)
- UIC classification: 2′B′+2′B′+B′2′
- Braking system: Electro-pneumatic (disc)
- Safety systems: AWS; TPWS
- Coupling system: BSI
- Multiple working: Within class, and with Class 165
- Track gauge: 1,435 mm (4 ft 8 1/2 in) standard gauge

The British Rail Class 166 Networker Turbo is a fleet of diesel-hydraulic multiple unit passenger trains, built by ABB Transportation at their Holgate Road Works in York between 1992 and 1993. They were specified by and built for British Rail, the state-owned railway operator in Great Britain at the time. The trains were designed as a faster, air-conditioned variant of the Class 165 Turbo, intended for longer-distance services, and, like the 165s, belong to the Networker family of trains. They are known as Networker Turbos to distinguish them from the electrically propelled members of that family. Today the 166s, alongside the 165s, are normally referred to as Thames Turbos, the Networker Turbo Express or just simply Turbos.

The Class 166s are still in service today, solely operated by Great Western Railway. Until 2017, they operated only on express and local services in the Thames Valley area alongside the Class 165 units. In this time, they were based at Reading TMD but since July 2017, the 166 units have been gradually moved over to be based at St Philip's Marsh depot to operate local and regional services around Bristol and Exeter. Nowadays, all of the 166s are based in Bristol while many 165s remain in the Thames Valley.

== Description ==
These units are a modification of the Class 165 design. They have a top speed of 90 mph (145 km/h) (suitable for mainline use), have vinyl throughout, and have air-conditioning. Externally, the Class 166 can be distinguished from a Class 165 by opening hoppers on every other window. Until late 2013 the presence of first class at each end was another distinguishing feature.

Other differences over a 165 are as follows:

- Air conditioning
- Two toilets (a 165 only has one toilet per unit)
- Tables in first class and in one third of the middle carriage
- Dedicated cycle/luggage storage in the middle carriage
- Different interior panelling between the door and seating areas

Twenty-one 3-car units were built, numbered 166201-221. Each unit was formed of two outer driving motors, and an intermediate motor. The technical description of the formation is DMCL-MS-DMSL. Individual carriages are numbered as follows:

- 58101-58121 - DMCL
- 58601-58621 - MS
- 58122-58142 - DMSL (changed from DMCL in 2013)

The units were built to replace Class 117, Class 119 and Class 121 DMUs, and locomotive-hauled trains on services from London Paddington along the Great Western Main Line.

Six cars were added to the original order in 1991 after Network SouthEast acquired some of the Cotswold Line services from Regional Railways to allow Class 158 units to be converted to Class 159s for the West of England services.

Their operation in the Bristol area is slightly different. All services in the Bristol area have guards and will in the future so the trains will not be driver only operated at all in the Bristol area. The practice of the opening/closing of the doors is also different, in which the driver releases the doors which are then closed by the guard. All 166 units now have local door panels fitted in at the doors of the end coaches, this is to allow the units to stop at stations with short platforms such as Avoncliff and Dilton Marsh. In these instances, the guard releases only their local door with these new panels, so drivers do not release the doors at the stations with short platforms. This method of operation has now been retrofitted to North Downs and Oxfordshire services.

== Operations ==
FGW dynamic lines liveried 166212 passes Hinksey (near Oxford) in 2011

When built, these units were operated by the Thames Line and North Downs Line subdivisions of Network SouthEast.

Their main destinations included fast-trains to Reading, Newbury and Oxford, with some services continuing beyond Oxford to Banbury and Stratford-upon-Avon, or along the Cotswold Line to Evesham, Worcester, Great Malvern and Hereford. Units are also used on the Reading to Gatwick Airport services along the North Downs Line. Many services operated by the 166 were branded as Turbo Express in the timetables.

Following privatisation, the units passed to the Thames Trains franchise. In April 2004, operation of the Thames Trains franchise passed to the First Great Western Link, and subsequently to First Great Western.

In 2012, First Great Western took delivery of five Class 180 Adelante units for Cotswold Line services, and three-car Class 150 Sprinter units for Reading to Basingstoke Line services, allowing Class 165 and 166 units to be used entirely for Thames Valley services.

Great Western Railway liveried 166208 at Keynsham in 2021

In July 2017, the 166s began to transfer over to be based at St Philip's Marsh depot in Bristol, where they would then begin operation on the Severn Beach line to allow other services to be strengthened further west. Since September 2017, they have rapidly been introduced on other services such as the Weston-super-Mare to Filton Abbey Wood / Bristol Parkway service and the Cardiff Central to Taunton services. In January 2018, they began service on the Golden Valley Line and in February 2018, they began service on the Heart of Wessex Line, as well as operating some services on the Wessex Main Line as far as Warminster and Southampton Central. In January 2019, they also began operating the regional service between Cardiff Central and Portsmouth Harbour which allowed more of the Class 158 units that solely operated this service to move further west.

In December 2020, they began operating on the Riviera Line and Avocet Line following the retirement of the Class 143 units.

The transfer of the 166 (and 165) units to services in and around Bristol and Exeter have overall allowed units that previously operated these services to move further west, such as the Class 150 and Class 158 units.

== London and Thames Valley Refresh ==
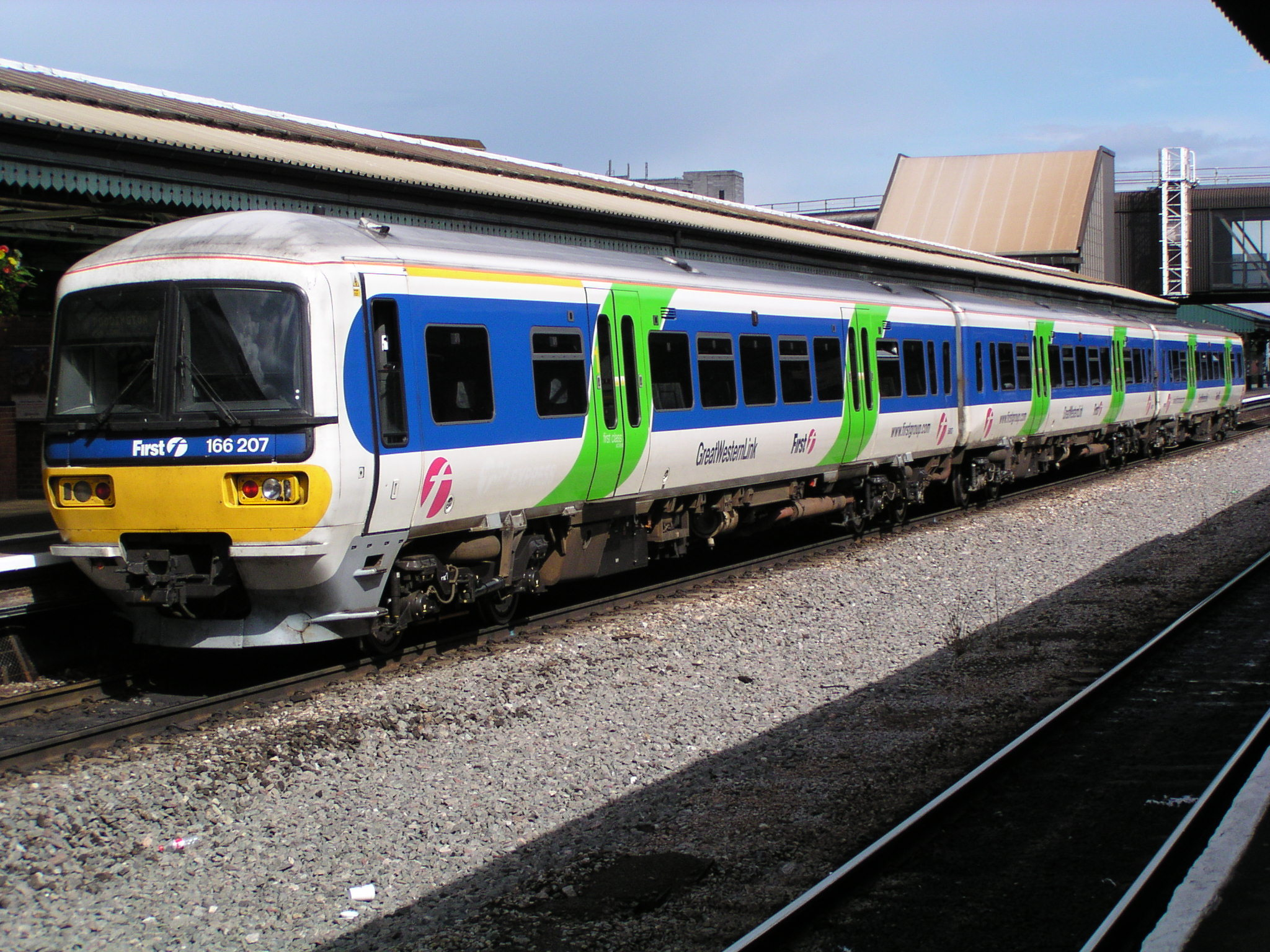
166207 in Thames Trains livery with First Great Western Link branding.

Towards the end of January 2010, First Great Western announced an £8 million refresh programme to their fleet of Class 166 Turbo DMU trains. The carpets and seats were retrimmed, interiors repainted, Passenger Information Displays replaced with a GPS-based system, and toilets upgraded. The refresh work was carried out at Reading Depot. All 151 vehicles have now been refurbished.

In late 2014, another set of refreshes to the Class 166 was started. The changes made during the 2010 refresh remain in place, with some upgrades, including the fitting of LED head/tail lights, new toilets which are more accessible than the old toilets, new door buzzers & new door buttons of the standard design with a round button on a yellow ring. All units have now received the refresh. Unit 166204 was named in honour of Twyford station master Norman Topsom MBE who retired in November 2015.

== Fleet details ==
Class	Operator	Qty.	Year built	Cars per unit	Unit nos.
166	Great Western Railway	21	1992–1993	3	166201–166221

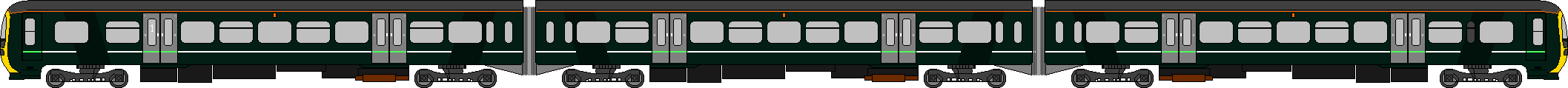
Great Western Railway Class 166 unit

== Named units ==
Some units received names

- 166204 Norman Topsom MBE
- 166221 Reading Train Care Depot (denamed)

== Liveries and interiors ==
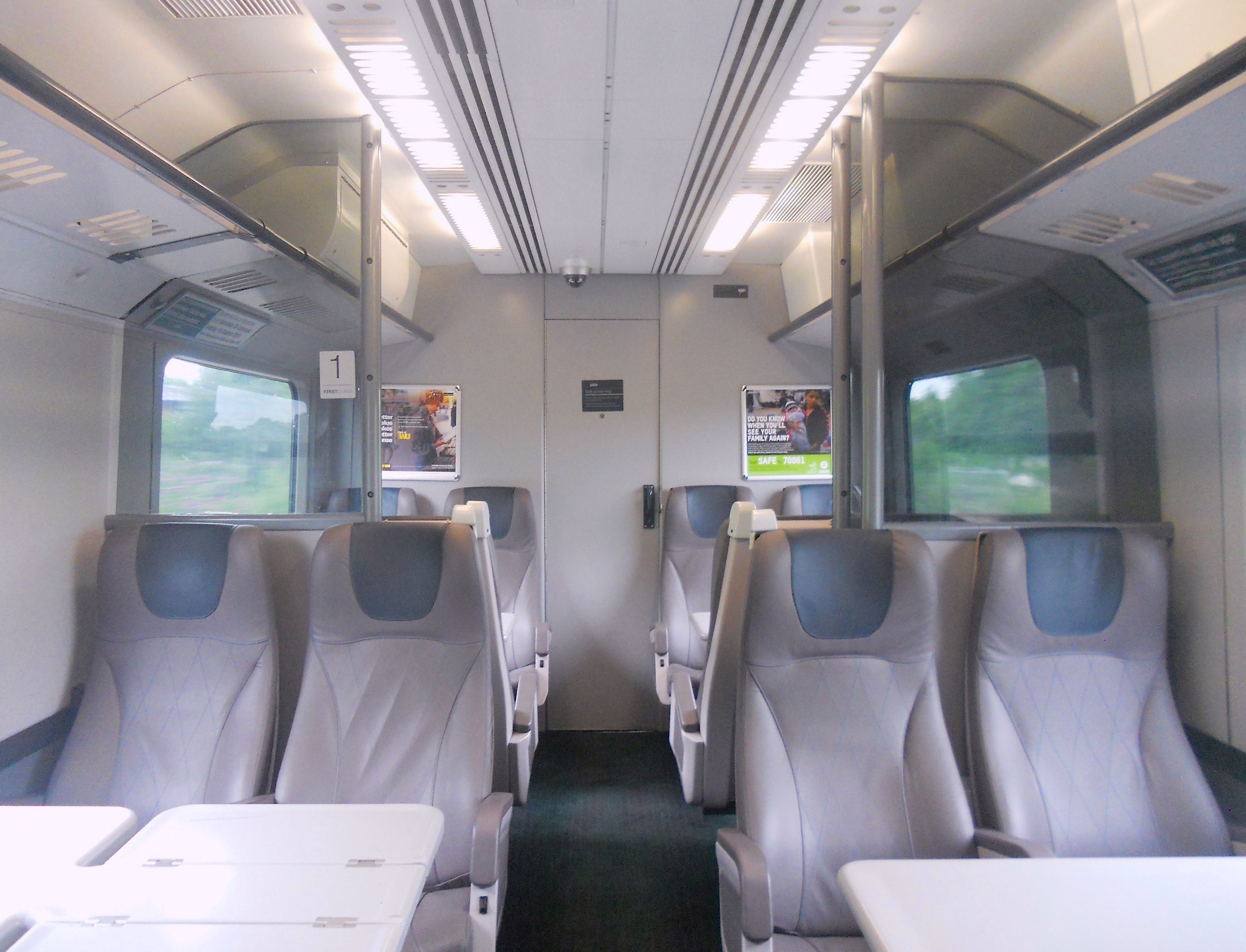
The refurbished interior of First Class cabin aboard GWR Class 166 166205

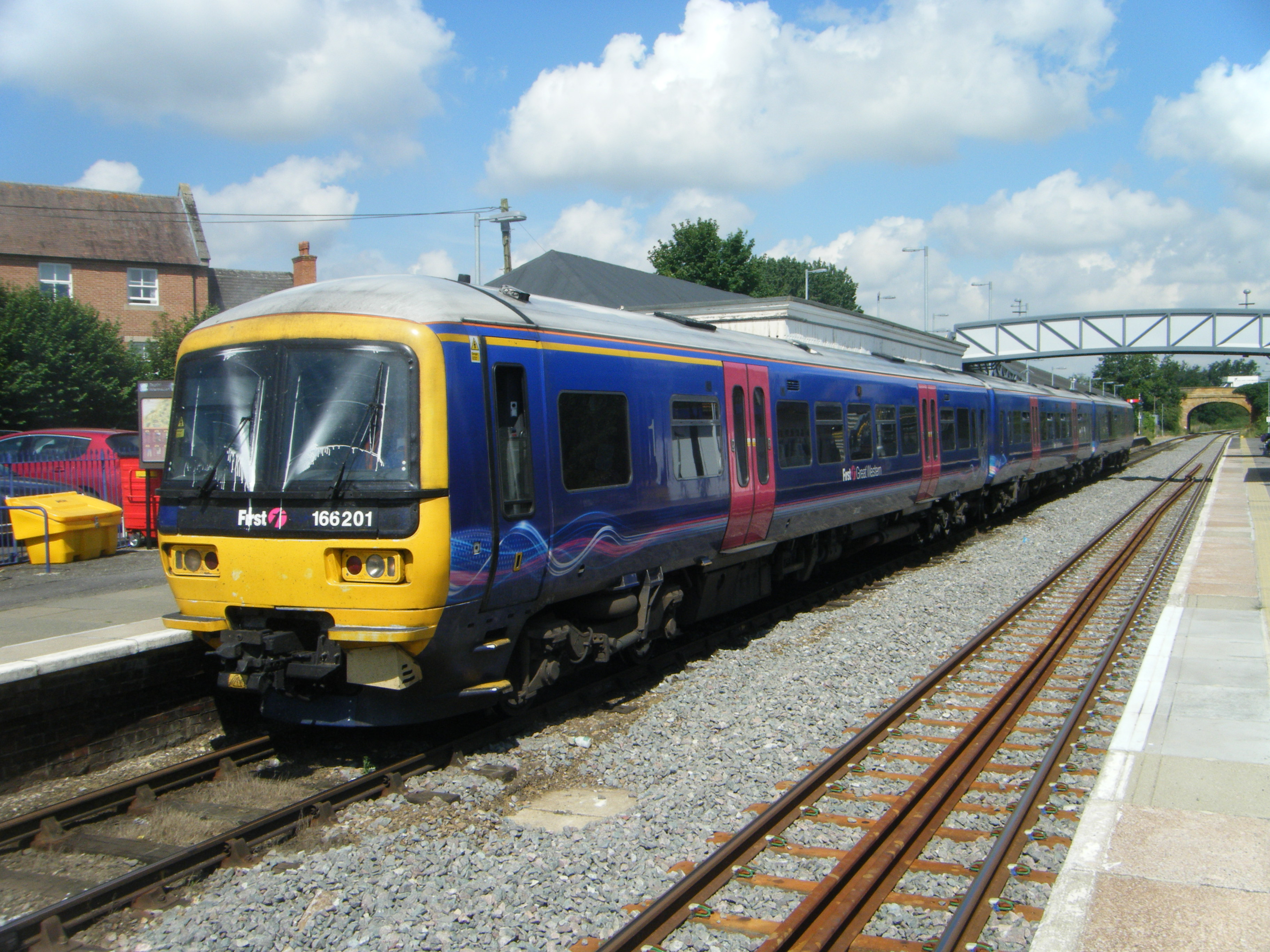
First Great Western Class 166 No. 166201 at Moreton in Marsh

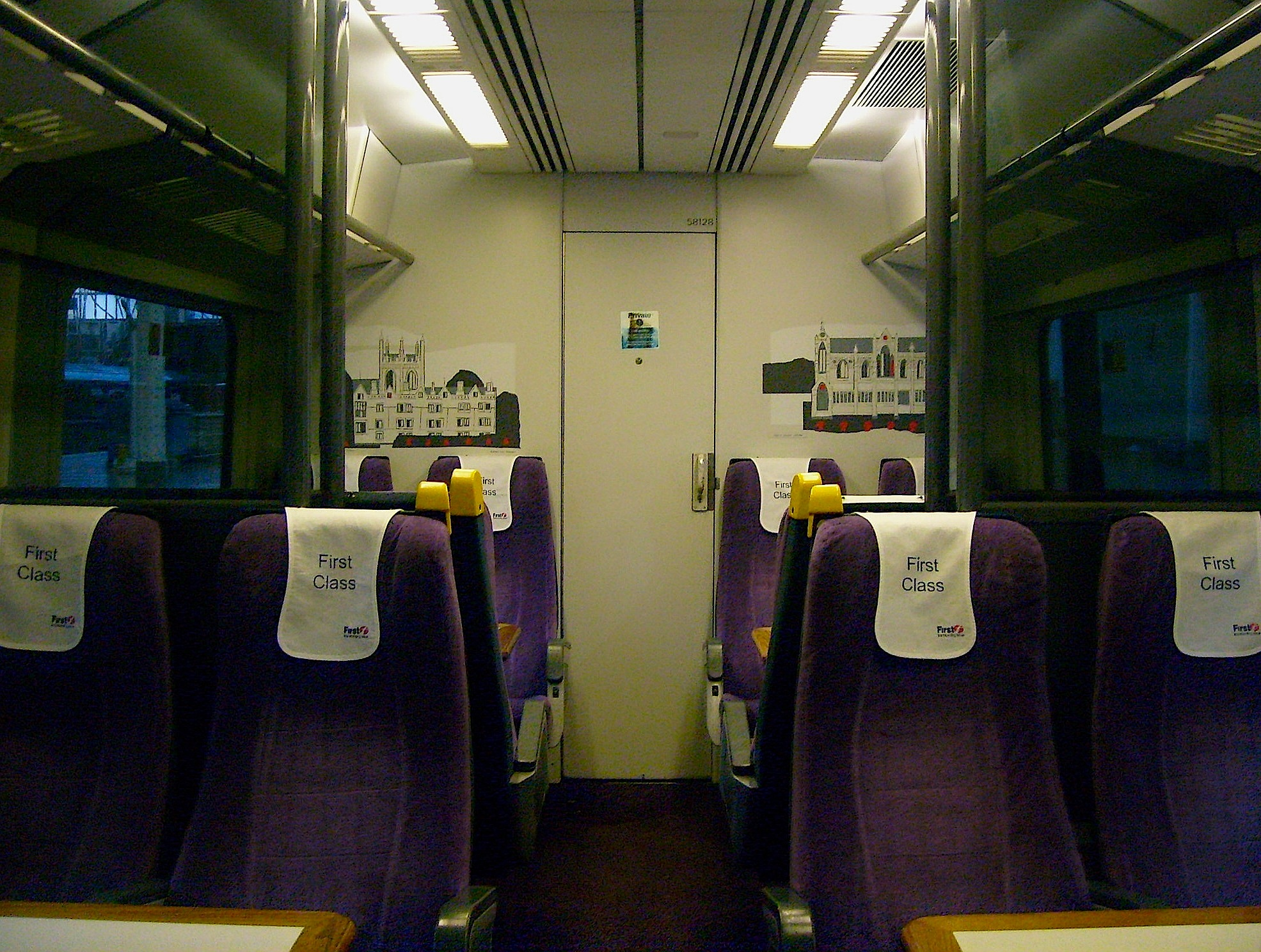
The interior of First Class cabin of First Great Western Class 166

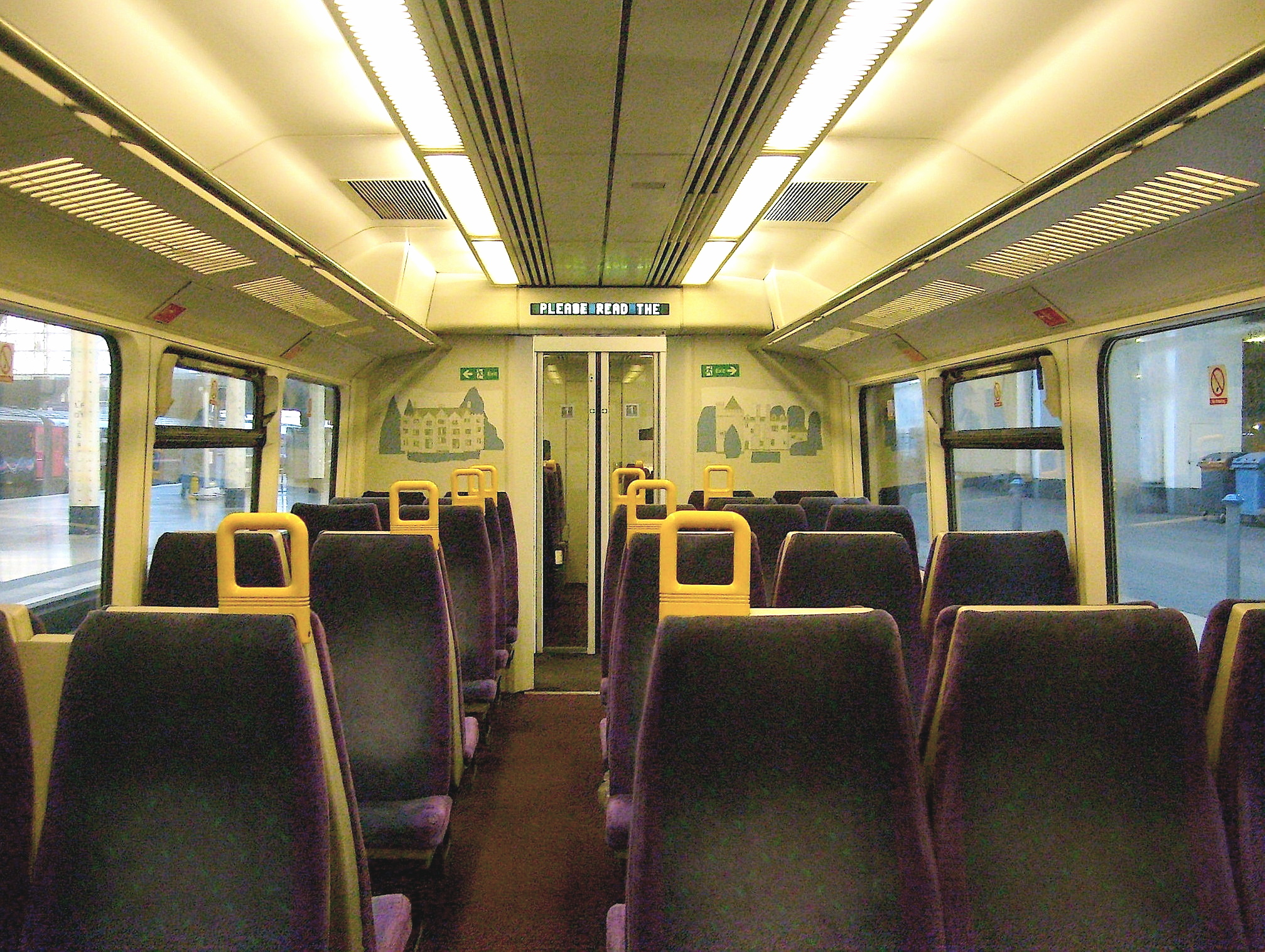
The interior of Standard Class accommodation of First Great Western Class 166

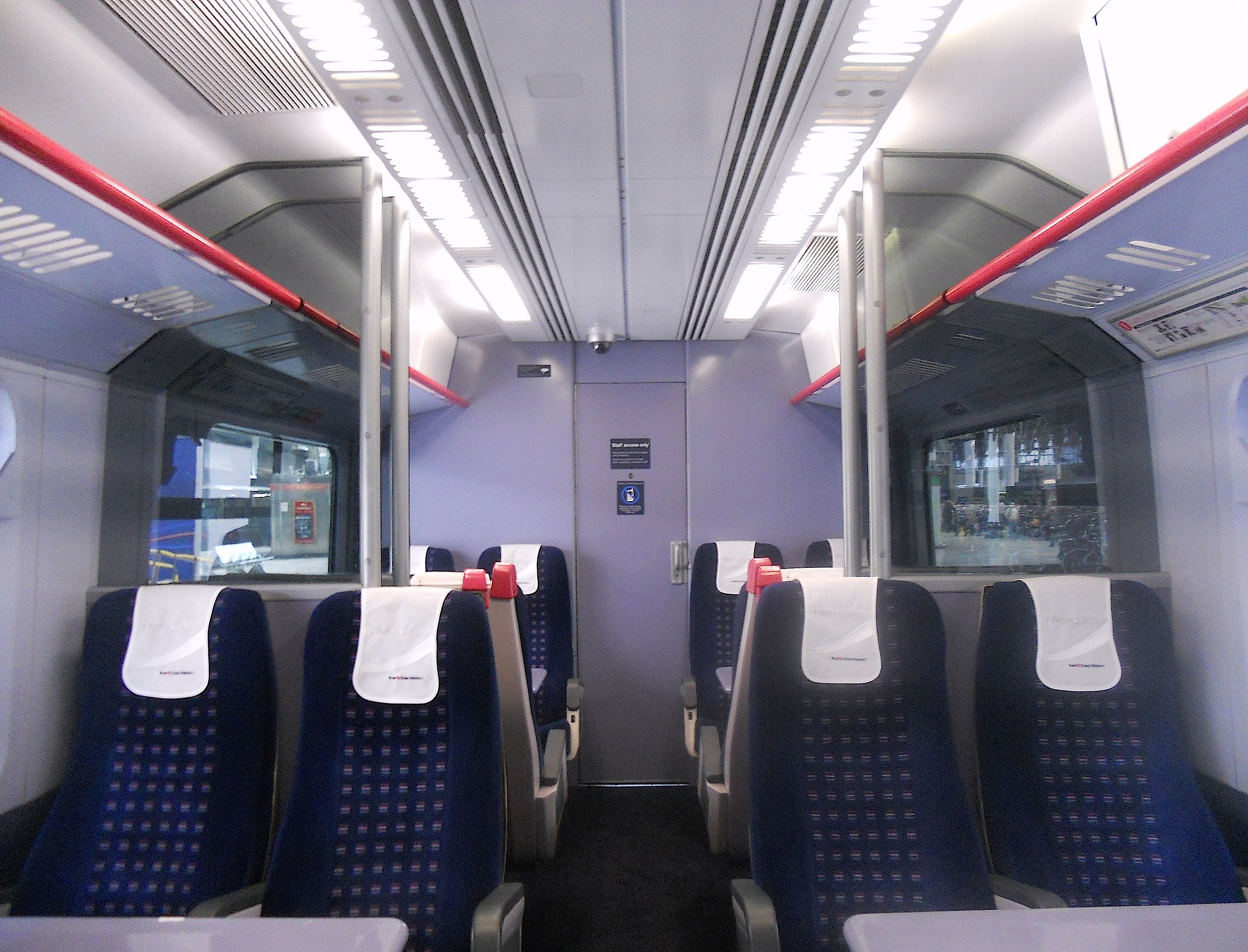
The refreshed interior of First Class cabin aboard a First Great Western Class 166

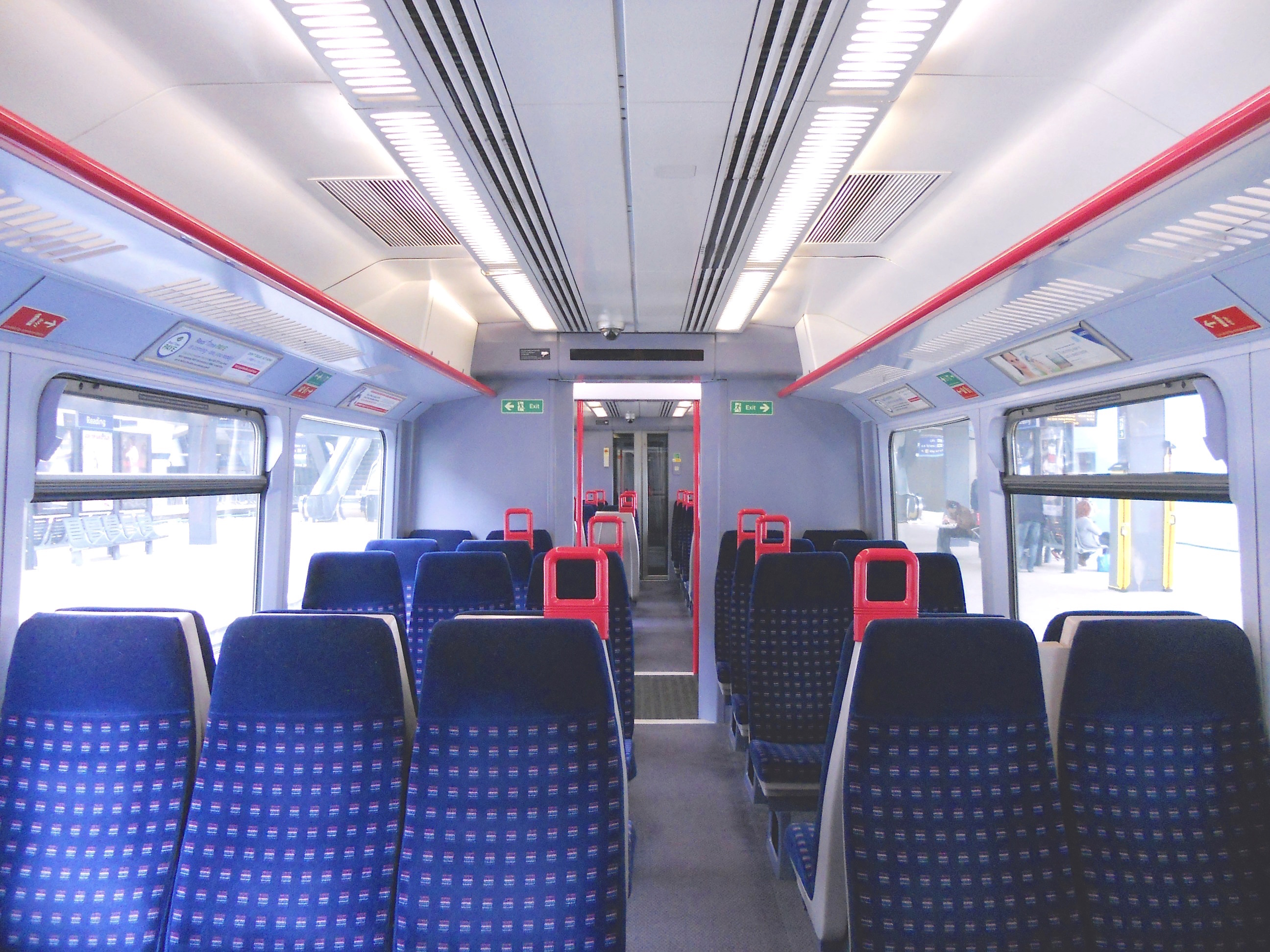
The refreshed interior of Standard Class accommodation aboard a First Great Western Class 166

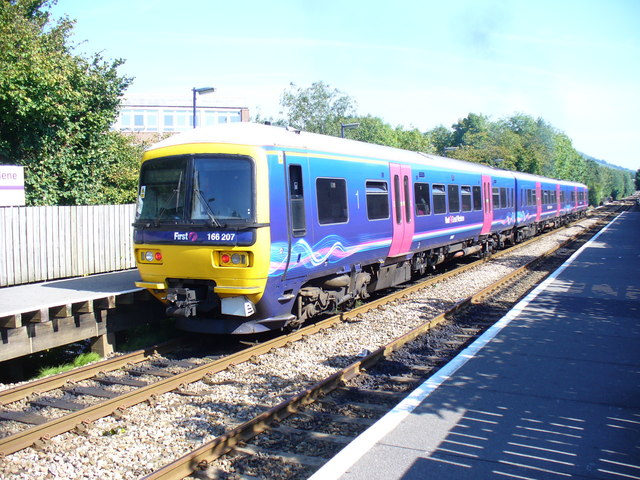
First Great Western Dynamic Lines livery (166207, 2008)

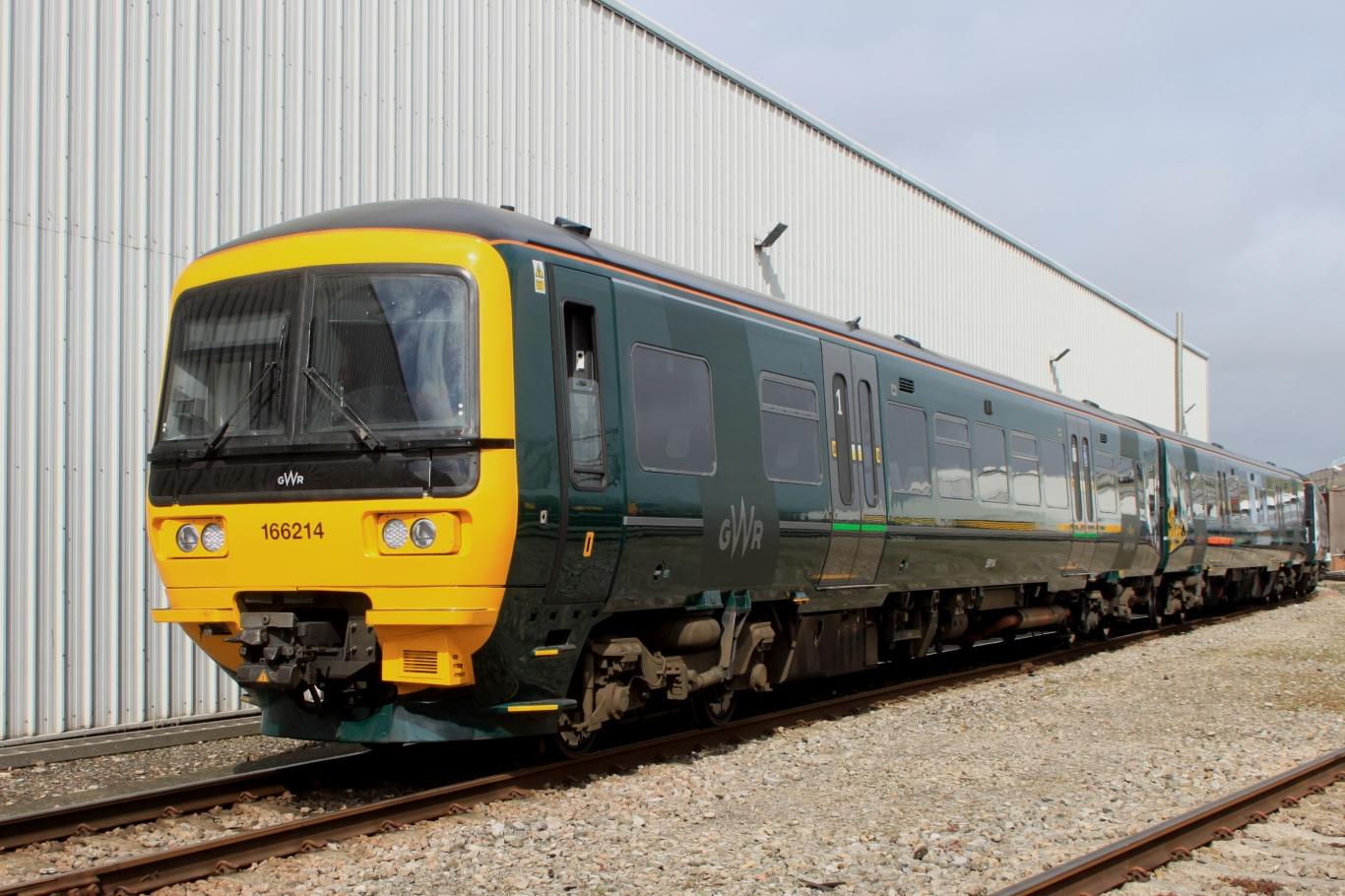
Great Western Railway refurbished green livery (166214, 2016)
