= British Rail Class 119 =

Class of British diesel multiple unit trains

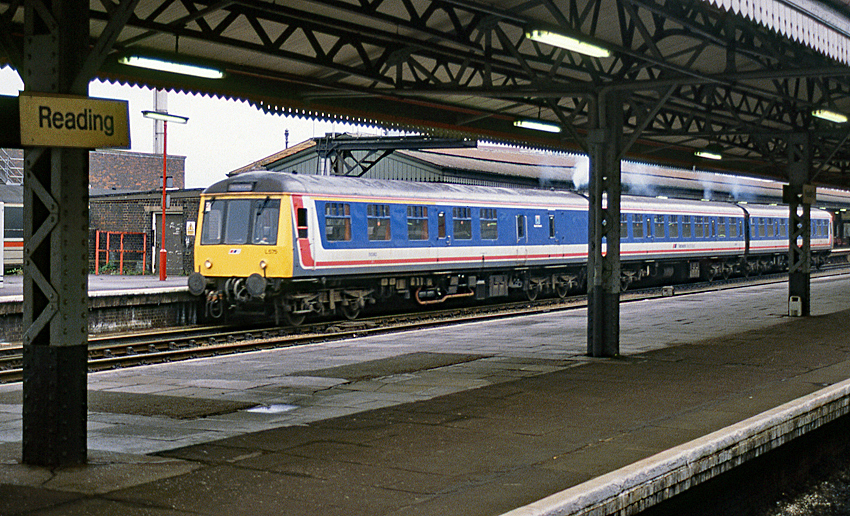
- 119 L575 at Reading in 1992
- In service: 1958–1992
- Manufacturer: Gloucester Railway Carriage & Wagon Co. Ltd
- Replaced: Steam locomotives and carriages
- Constructed: 1958
- Number built: 84 cars
- Number preserved: 3 cars
- Number scrapped: 81 cars (26 DMBC, 27 DMSL, 25 TSLRB)
- Formation: DMBC-TSLRB-DMSL
- Capacity: DMBC: 18 first, 16 second; TSLRB: 60 second; DMSL: 68 second
- Operator: British Rail
- Line served: Western Region

Specifications
- Car body construction: Steel
- Car length: 64 ft 6 in (19.66 m)
- Width: 9 ft 3 in (2.82 m)
- Height: 12 ft 8 1/4 in (3.87 m)
- Maximum speed: 70 mph (113 km/h)
- Weight: DMBC: 37.0 long tons (37.6 t; 41.4 short tons); TSLRB: 31.0 long tons (31.5 t; 34.7 short tons); DMSL: 38.0 long tons (38.6 t; 42.6 short tons)
- Prime movers: Two BUT (AEC), then BUT (Leyland 680-1595) of 150 hp (112 kW) per power car
- Power output: 600 hp (447 kW) per 3-car set
- Transmission: Mechanical
- HVAC: Oil-burning air heater
- Bogies: DD10 mk3 and mk4 (DMBS, one of each); DT9 mk4 and mk5 (DTS, one of each)
- Braking system: Vacuum
- Safety system: Automatic Warning System
- Coupling system: Screw
- Multiple working: ■ Blue Square
- Track gauge: 4 ft 8 1/2 in (1,435 mm)

The British Rail Class 119 DMUs were used throughout the Western Region and on services in the Midlands sourced by Tyseley Depot. Built by the Gloucester Railway Carriage & Wagon Co. Ltd, the body design was based on the Swindon Cross-Country sets, but with a Derby cab.

== Accidents and incidents ==
- On 1 August 1990, unit L576 collided with a passenger train comprising 4VEP electric multiple units 3508 & 3504, and 4CIG unit 1304 at Reading due to overrunning signals. Forty people were injured.

== Preservation ==
- 51073 (DMBC) Swindon and Cricklade Railway

2 vehicles are currently undergoing restoration on the Swindon and Cricklade Railway (updated 14/6/12), now in service (09/05/19).
