= Sheepridge =

Hamlet in Buckinghamshire, England

Coordinates: 51.598°N 0.724°W

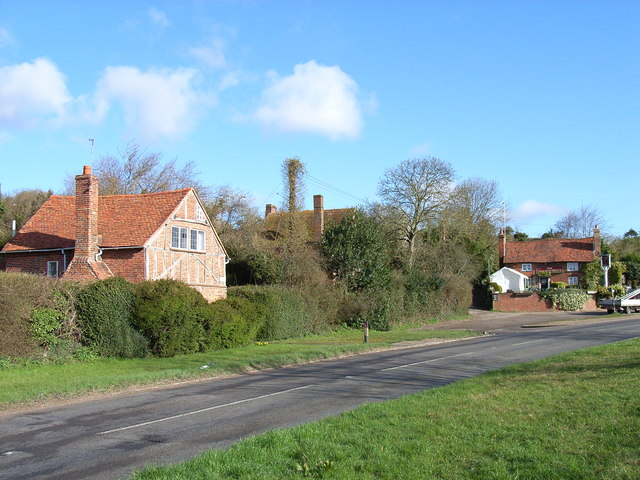
Sheepridge: Woodman's Cottage and the Crooked Billet pub, 2006

Sheepridge is a hamlet in the parish of Little Marlow, in Buckinghamshire, England.

The hamlet is located in a small indentation of an outlying part of the Chiltern Hills. It can be found on Sheepridge Lane, which connects Flackwell Heath to Well End and Bourne End.

It lies on the Chiltern Way.

There are a few houses and one public house, The Crooked Billet. The pub is an early 18th century timber inn that is Grade II listed.
