= Warren Nature Reserve =

Local nature reserve in Buckinghamshire, England

Coordinates: 51.5835°N 0.68368°W

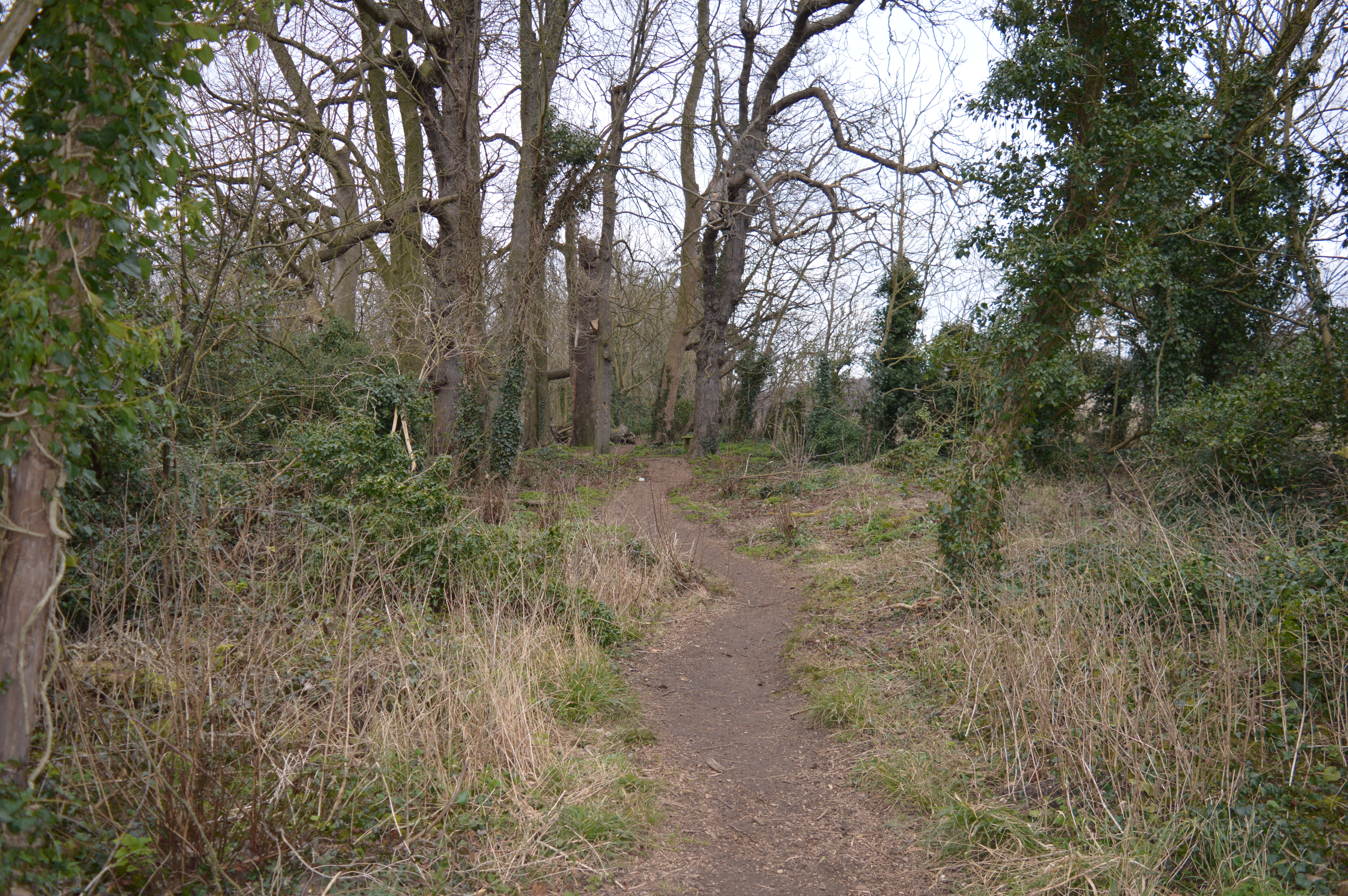

Warren Nature Reserve is a 2.3 hectares (5.7 acres) Local Nature Reserve in Wooburn in Buckinghamshire. It is owned by Wycombe District Council and managed by the council together with Wooburn and Bourne End parish council.

The River Wye runs along the north-west border of the site, providing a habitat for birds such as mallards, herons and kingfishers. The reserve is wooded with a variety of trees such as ash, lime and oak. Animals include badgers, voles, grass snakes, muntjac deer and bats.

There is access from Wooburn Park and the road called Wooburn Manor Park
