= Burnham Park =

Burnham Park may refer to:

- Burnham Park (Chicago)
- Burnham Park (Baguio)
- The E-ACT Burnham Park Academy, an academy school in Burnham, Buckinghamshire, England
