= Little Marlow Lakes Country Park =

Green space in Buckinghamshire, England

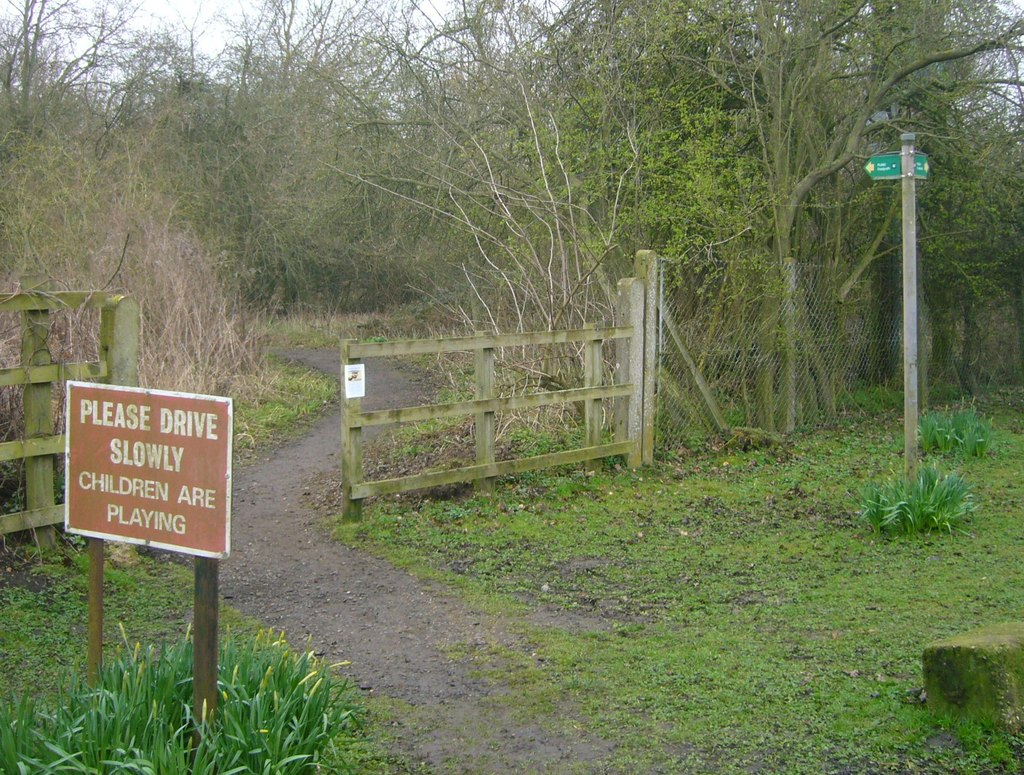
Path from Little Marlow into Spade Oak Nature Reserve

Little Marlow Lakes Country Park, is a proposed park near Little Marlow in Buckinghamshire, England. Ideas to develop a park in the area have been discussed since the 1960s. More recent proposals have been made to use designation under the Countryside Act 1968 to enable the project.

== History ==
In the 19th century the area was largely in agricultural use. Private parkland existed around the setting of Westhorpe House. Throughout the 1960s and 1970s, substantial areas around Little Marlow were used for gravel extraction, including almost all of the parkland and later as landfill sites, resulting in soil contamination with hazardous waste.

== Legal status and ownership ==
"A Vision for Little Marlow Lakes Country Park" in 2002 set out local authority supplementary planning guidance which states that "Land ownership of the Gravel Pits is predominantly private and fragmented" and "has a complex distribution of land ownership. The pattern of land ownership has a significant influence on the current and future use of the land. In particular, it raises complex issues in terms of land assembly and/or co-operation as landowners have to participate fully in the development process in order for a comprehensive, co-ordinated facility to be developed"

On 9 October 2017, Wycombe District Council resolved to include an allocation RUR4 ‘Little Marlow Lakes Country Park’ in the Wycombe District Development Plan and to use its powers under section 7 of the 1968 Countryside Act to promote a Country Park.

The supporting documents recommending the decision state "Virtually all of the land is in private ownership. Some working arrangement between the owners will be required, probably through a Memorandum of Agreement". The council delegated the facilitation of the park’s delivery including management arrangements "working with landowners and other partners as necessary" to officers, in consultation with the local cabinet member for community services supervising.

As a result, the 2019 adopted Wycombe District Development Plan identifies a substantial area of approximately 329 ha between the A4155 to the north and the River Thames to the south and between A404(M) motorway to the west and Coldmoorholme Lane to the east as potential Country Park.

On 11 October 2022, as the successor local authority, Buckinghamshire Council, controlling 16% of the identified 329 ha, continued to be the only landowner proposing land to deliver any of the local plan allocation and future designation under the Countryside Act 1968.

The Council’s legal officer set out that "The provisions within the act provide essentially that in order to provide a country park you have to have the agreement (either you own the land, or you have to have the agreement of adjacent or adjoining landowners). The difficulty with the district council decision is that further work in relation to getting agreement with landowners hasn’t been undertaken".

Cllr Peter Strachan, answering councillors’ questions on the Buckinghamshire decision as the statutory authority said: "Allocating a site in a local plan is very different to implementing that site. For example, local plans will often allocate sites for new housing, but that in itself does not guarantee the delivery of housing. In those cases, further planning applications are required to implement that allocation. That is essentially the same as has happened here."

Considerable parts of the proposed park continue to be in multiple private ownerships including as current Residential, Commercial and Industrial sites and former Gravel extraction landfill uses.

== Countryside Act 1968 ==
The power to designate land for Country Parks is granted to Local Authorities by section 7(3) of the act of parliament either:

"(a) on land belonging to them, or (b) on such terms as may be agreed with the owners and any other persons whose authority is required for the purpose, on other land".

Public paths run through the area, with access points in Little Marlow, Coldmoorholme Lane and via the Thames Path. The lower parts of the area sit within the 100-year floodplain of the Thames. The entire site lies within the Metropolitan Green Belt. It is located south of the Chiltern Hills Area of Outstanding Natural Beauty (AONB).

== Nature and wildlife ==
The area around the easternmost lake is known as Spade Oak Nature Reserve. There is a large variety of waterfowl in and around the lake, including kingfisher, grebe and wigeon. The area is also home to skylark, owl, badger, bat, amphibian and reptile species, as well as stag beetle. Wildflowers include teasel and orchid.

== Other uses ==
=== Residential ===
There are residences in the parish of Little Marlow, as well as Westhorpe House and the Westhorpe Park Mobile Home Park. There is a Crowne Plaza hotel in the southwest corner.

=== Recreation ===
Sports facilities and activities in the area include an athletics track, angling for members of the Marlow Angling Club, open water swimming, paddleboarding and water skiing.

=== Industrial and commercial ===
The Little Marlow Sewage Treatment Works lies in the area. There have been several reports over the years of raw sewage spilling into the Thames, the nearby nature reserve or Little Marlow.

In early 2021, part of the former gravel workings at Spade Oak Lake were used to build the town of Ferrix as a temporary film set for production of the Andor season one.
