= Fern, Buckinghamshire =

Hamlet in Buckinghamshire, England

Coordinates: 51.589°N 0.7281°W

Fern is a hamlet in the parish of Little Marlow, in Buckinghamshire, England.

Historically this was a wasteland area of the parish, off the Marlow to Bourne End road. A workhouse was built here in 1781, which was a productive needlework and embroidery manufactory during the Victorian times. After the workhouse was sold to private hands in the early twentieth century, it became known as Fern House, and other cottages and houses were built along what is now Fern Lane.

The Little Marlow parish cemetery is located at the end of the road. It was consecrated in 1900 and has a small chapel. The popular crime writer Edgar Wallace is buried there.

There is a small, disused gravel pit in the hamlet, the Fern House Gravel Pit. Significant geological formations have been noted in the sides of the pit and this is now a Site of Special Scientific Interest.

Adjacent to Fern, on Sheepridge Lane, is the headquarters of the Vulcan Explorer Scouts unit.
