= Wooburn =

Village in Buckinghamshire, England

Coordinates: 51.581°N 0.691°W

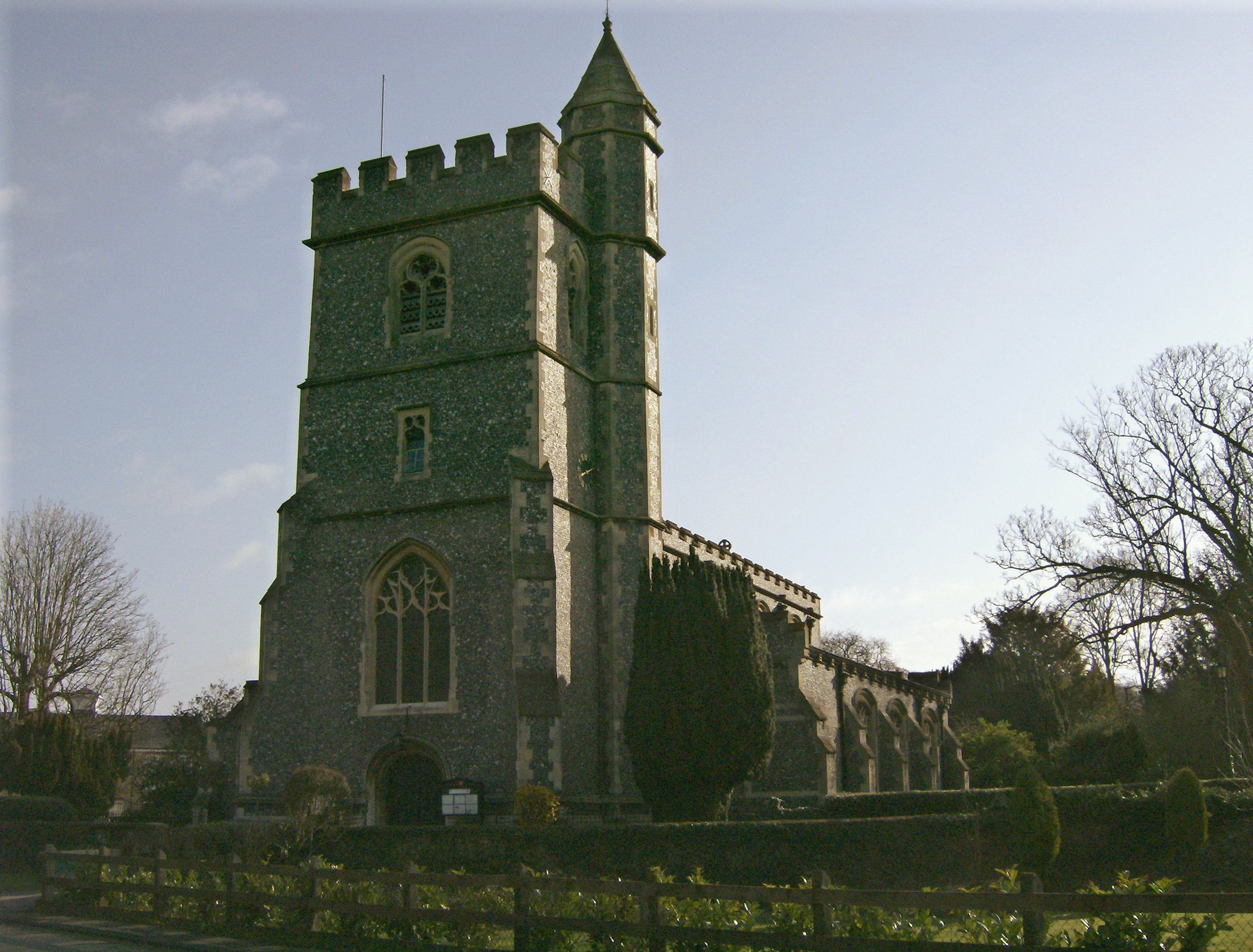
- St. Paul's parish church

- Location within Buckinghamshire
- Population: 10,792 (2011 Census including Hedsor)
- OS grid reference: SU908877
- Civil parish: Wooburn
- Unitary authority: Buckinghamshire
- Ceremonial county: Buckinghamshire
- Region: South East
- Country: England
- Sovereign state: United Kingdom
- Post town: High Wycombe
- Postcode district: HP10
- Dialling code: 01628
- Police: Thames Valley
- Fire: Buckinghamshire
- Ambulance: South Central
- UK Parliament: Beaconsfield

Wooburn is a large village in Buckinghamshire, England. It is located off the A4094 road between Wooburn Green and Bourne End in the very south of the county near the River Thames, about two miles south west of Beaconsfield and four miles east of Marlow. Wooburn is one of the two principal settlements within Wooburn, a civil parish in Wycombe district.

The village toponym is derived from the Old English for "walled stream". This refers to the River Wye, which has its source near West Wycombe and runs through the village to join the River Thames at Bourne End. The river runs along the boundary of Warren Nature Reserve, a Local Nature Reserve which adjoins Wooburn Park. In the Domesday Book of 1086 the village was recorded as Waborne though earlier, in 1075, it had been referred to as Waburna. The Church of England parish church of Saint Paul is medieval but was extensively altered by the Gothic Revival architect William Butterfield in 1869. It has a flint nave and a tall tower. There are some half timbered houses facing the churchyard and nearby there is a flint school house.

The manor house of Wooburn was once a palace of the Bishops of Lincoln.

The former Wooburn Grange Country Club was used as the exterior of the Fawlty Towers hotel in the classic 1970s sitcom. The building was destroyed in a fire in 1991, then demolished and a housing estate was built on the site.

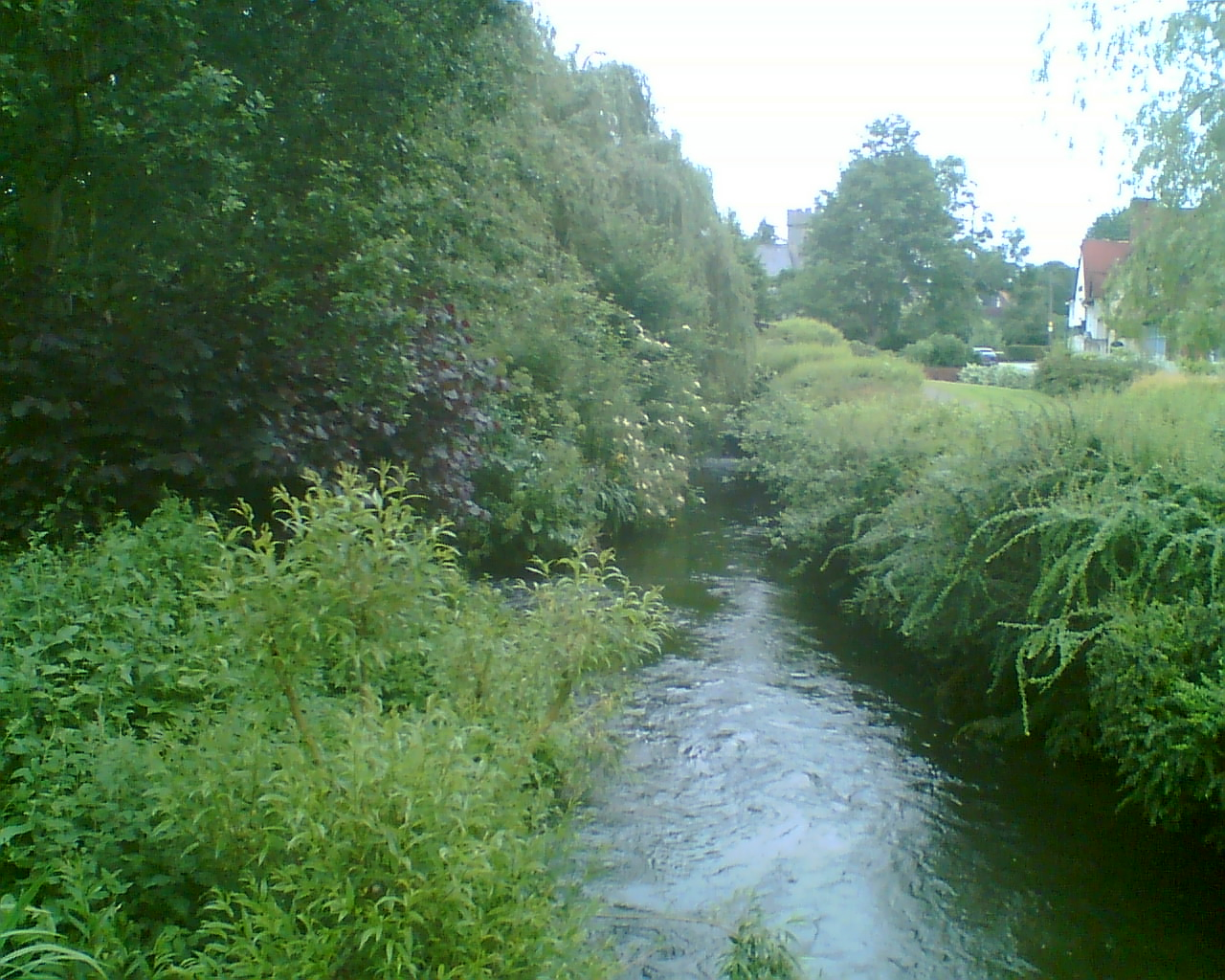
The River Wye at Wooburn
