= Fern House Gravel Pit =

Geological site in Buckinghamshire, England

Coordinates: 51.5884°N 0.7268°W

- Site of Special Scientific Interest
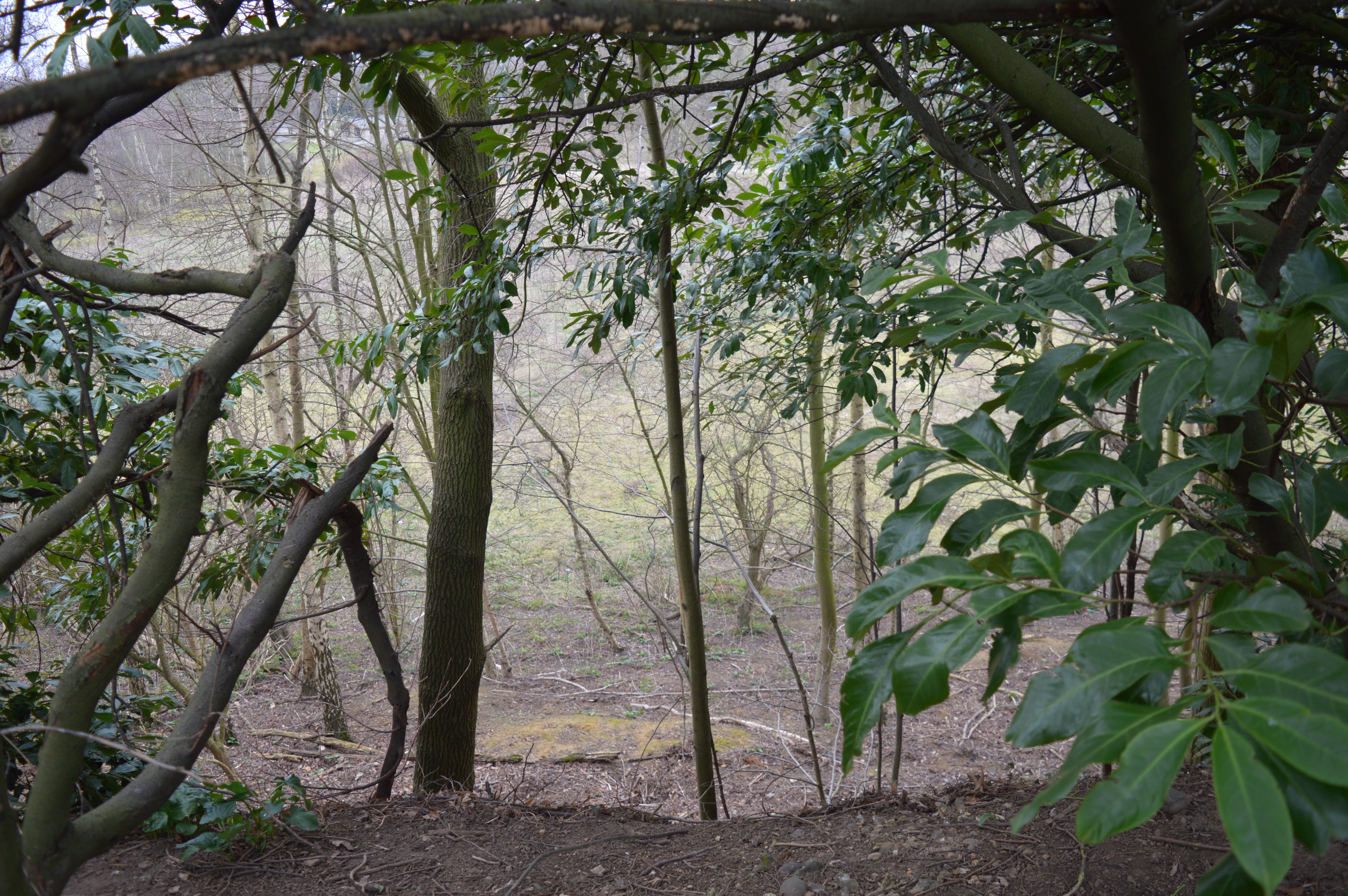
- Location of Fern House Gravel Pit.
- Area of search: Buckinghamshire
- Grid reference: SU883885
- Interest: Geological
- Area: 1.3 ha (3.2 acres)
- Notification date: 1986
- Location map: Magic Map

Fern House Gravel Pit is a 1.3-hectare (3.2-acre) geological Site of Special Scientific Interest in Fern, near Bourne End in Buckinghamshire. It is also a Geological Conservation Review site.

This site exposes the Pleistocene Taplow Gravel formation, and may help to elucidate a poorly understood period in the history of the River Thames, between glacial Anglian stage, around 450,000 years ago, when the river was diverted south to its present course, and the warm Ipswichian around 120,000 years ago. Fossils found at the site include straight-tusked elephants and mammoths.

The site is on private land with no public access.
