= Berghers Hill =

Hamlet in Buckinghamshire, England

Coordinates: 51.582°N 0.676°W

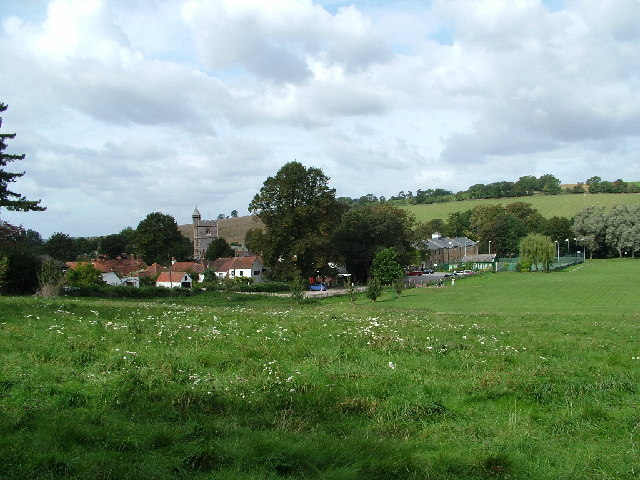
- Wooburn from Berghers Hill, 2004

- Location within Buckinghamshire
- Population: 80
- OS grid reference: SU918878
- Civil parish: Wooburn
- Unitary authority: Buckinghamshire
- Ceremonial county: Buckinghamshire
- Region: South East
- Country: England
- Sovereign state: United Kingdom
- Post town: High Wycombe
- Postcode district: HP10
- Dialling code: 01628
- Police: Thames Valley
- Fire: Buckinghamshire
- Ambulance: South Central
- UK Parliament: Beaconsfield

Berghers Hill is a hamlet in Wooburn civil parish in Buckinghamshire, England. It lies just behind the escarpment of the valley of the River Wye.

== History ==
Berghers Hill was recorded as Beggars Hill in the 18th-century, though several of the buildings feature 17th-century work, suggesting earlier settlement.

The Conservation Area was designated in May 1994 by Wycombe District Council.
