= Well End =

Well End may refer to:

- Well End, Buckinghamshire
- Well End, Hertfordshire
