= The E-ACT Burnham Park Academy =

Burnham Park E-ACT Academy

Location
- Opendale Road; Burnham, Buckinghamshire, SL1 7LZ; England; 51.5293°N 0.6610°W

Information
- Type: Academy
- Motto: Best practise, best performance, best progress - always
- Established: 1969
- Founder: Robert Turner
- Closed: 2019
- Department for Education URN: 137864 Tables
- Ofsted: Reports
- Gender: Mixed
- Age: 11 to 18
- Capacity: 700
- Website: https://burnhamparkacademy.e-act.org.uk

The E-ACT Burnham Park Academy was a co-educational academy in Burnham, Buckinghamshire, England until it closed in 2019 due to falling pupil numbers. A small part of the campus is located in neighbouring Slough, Berkshire. The academy was sponsored by E-ACT, and had approximately 235 pupils.

The school operated as a comprehensive school in a selective local authority. Approximately 40% of students came from Buckinghamshire, with the remainder coming from West Slough.

In 2021, the Netflix series Heartstopper was filmed on the grounds of the school after its closure.

== History ==
The Academy was opened in April 2012, following the closure of Burnham Upper School, which was deemed to require Special Measures in March 2011. The Academy is sponsored by National Educational Charity, E-ACT. In April 2014, the Academy was re-inspected as a new establishment, with Ofsted stating that the school 'Requires Improvement'. In December 2015 the school featured in local news for not testing pupils with dyslexia.

Burnham Park was inspected by Ofsted again in July 2016, and overall graded 'Inadequate', leading to the school being placed in special measures. The report states that special needs pupils and disadvantaged pupils did not make good progress. The Headteacher of the school, Russell Denial left the school and was due to be replaced by the Principal Director of The Crest Boys E-ACT Academy in Neasden, Elroy Cahill. However shortly after announcing the appointment, E-ACT shared with staff and families that Mr Cahill would instead become the Headteacher at another E-ACT school and appointed Mr James Whelan as Headteacher, who joined from his role as Deputy Headteacher at Oldham Academy North, an E-ACT school near Manchester. Mr Whelan took up post as Headteacher in September 2016. The school was inspected again in March 2017, December 2017 and June 2018. The reports stated progress was being made towards coming out of special measures, but special needs pupils were not making strong progress and the recommendations of the external pupil premium report were still not being fully implemented. The school is however working towards resolving these issues as of the most recent inspection. the report in June 2018 states 5 teachers have left and the school is finding it difficult to recruit replacement teachers. In March 2019 the school was inspected again and found to be inadequate again. On the first day of the inspection 15 of the 20 teachers were sick or absent. The Secretary of State for education has now agreed for Burnham Park to close.

Since the 2014 -2015 academic year, the school received extra pupil premium funding to support teaching of English, Maths and Science to narrow the attainment gap. This funding was less successful in Science. In 2017 Ofsted requested external review of the effectiveness of pupil premium usage.

Pupil numbers were low. In 2015 80 pupils applied to join the school, with this figure dropping to 55 in 2016, 21 in 2017 and increasing to 30 in 2018. Pupil numbers fell to 224 as of February 2019 and the school consulted about possible closure. When the school closed in August 2019 pupils were offered places at Bourne End Academy with coaches provided from Burnham.

== Academic results ==
In 2013 53% of pupils at the Academy achieved 5 GCSEs or equivalent at grades A*-C including English and Maths. However, achievement has since declined over subsequent years, with this figure falling to 35% in 2015. 33% of students achieved at least 2 A-Levels at grades A* to E in 2015.

The Progress 8 figure, the new government measure for progress, for Burnham Park in 2016 was -1.07, which is well below the average Progress 8 for schools in England. 29% of pupils passed GCSE English and Maths with grades A*-C in 2016. 2017 results show an improvement to -0.40 for Progress 8 and 35% of pupils earned grade 5 or above in English and Maths. 47% achieved grade 4 or above in these two subjects. The provisional Progress 8 figure for 2018 is -0.64, well below average.

== Phone mast ==
Burnham Park E-ACT Academy was one of several Buckinghamshire schools which host mobile phone masts. Contracts between Buckinghamshire County Council and various mobile phone operators generate an income of £145,000 per annum, of which about £59,000 comes from contracts for masts that are installed in schools.

== Closure ==
The school closed in 2019 due to falling pupil numbers. Pupils were given the option to transfer to Bourne End Academy.
