= Widmoor =

Hamlet in Buckinghamshire, England

Coordinates: 51.57362°N 0.68685°W

- Location within Buckinghamshire
- Population: 160
- OS grid reference: SU911869
- Civil parish: Wooburn
- Unitary authority: Buckinghamshire
- Ceremonial county: Buckinghamshire
- Region: South East
- Country: England
- Sovereign state: United Kingdom
- Post town: HIGH WYCOMBE
- Postcode district: HP10
- Dialling code: 01628
- Police: Thames Valley
- Fire: Buckinghamshire
- Ambulance: South Central
- UK Parliament: Beaconsfield

Widmoor is a hamlet in the parishes of Hedsor and Wooburn, in Buckinghamshire, England.
