= Wooburn and Bourne End =

Civil parish in Buckinghamshire, England

Coordinates: 51.58086°N 0.69097°W

Wooburn
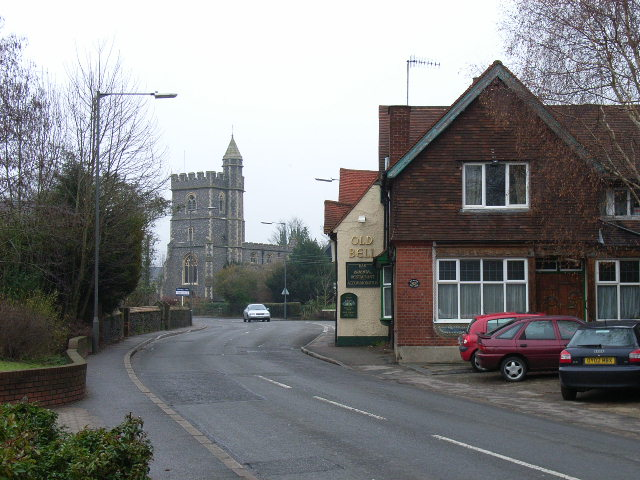
- Wooburn

- Location within Buckinghamshire
- Population: 10,172 (2011)
- OS grid reference: SU908877
- Civil parish: Wooburn
- Unitary authority: Buckinghamshire
- Ceremonial county: Buckinghamshire
- Region: South East
- Country: England
- Sovereign state: United Kingdom
- Post town: BOURNE END
- Postcode district: SL8
- Post town: HIGH WYCOMBE
- Postcode district: HP10
- Dialling code: 01628
- Police: Thames Valley
- Fire: Buckinghamshire
- Ambulance: South Central
- UK Parliament: Beaconsfield

Wooburn, or Wooburn and Bourne End, is a civil parish in Buckinghamshire, England. South-east of High Wycombe, it comprises the villages of Wooburn, Wooburn Green and Bourne End and the hamlets of Berghers Hill, Cores End, Hawks Hill, Widmoor and Wooburn Moor. The Buckinghamshire River Wye flows through the area, emptying into the River Thames at Bourne End. In 2011 the parish had a population of 10,172.
