= Cores End =

Coordinates: 51.5772°N 0.6960°W

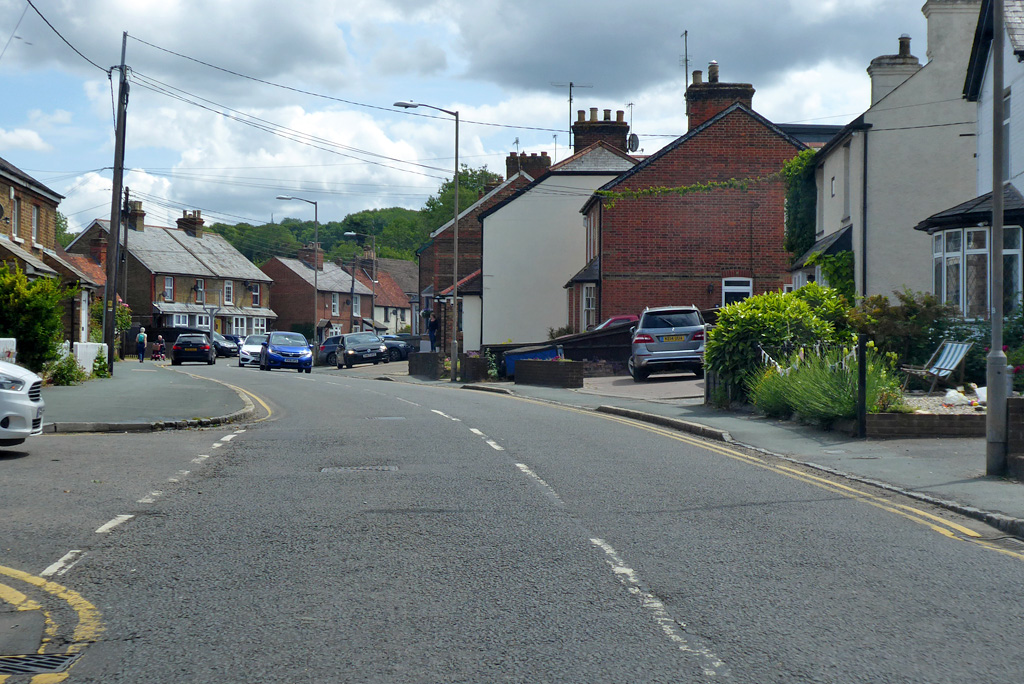

- Location within Buckinghamshire
- Population: 160
- OS grid reference: SU903873
- Civil parish: Wooburn
- Unitary authority: Buckinghamshire
- Ceremonial county: Buckinghamshire
- Region: South East
- Country: England
- Sovereign state: United Kingdom
- Post town: BOURNE END
- Postcode district: SL8
- Dialling code: 01628
- Police: Thames Valley
- Fire: Buckinghamshire
- Ambulance: South Central
- UK Parliament: Beaconsfield

Cores End is a hamlet in the civil parish of Wooburn (where at the 2011 Census the population was included), in Buckinghamshire, England.
