= Well End, Buckinghamshire =

Hamlet in Buckinghamshire, England

Coordinates: 51.58296°N 0.71833°W

Well End
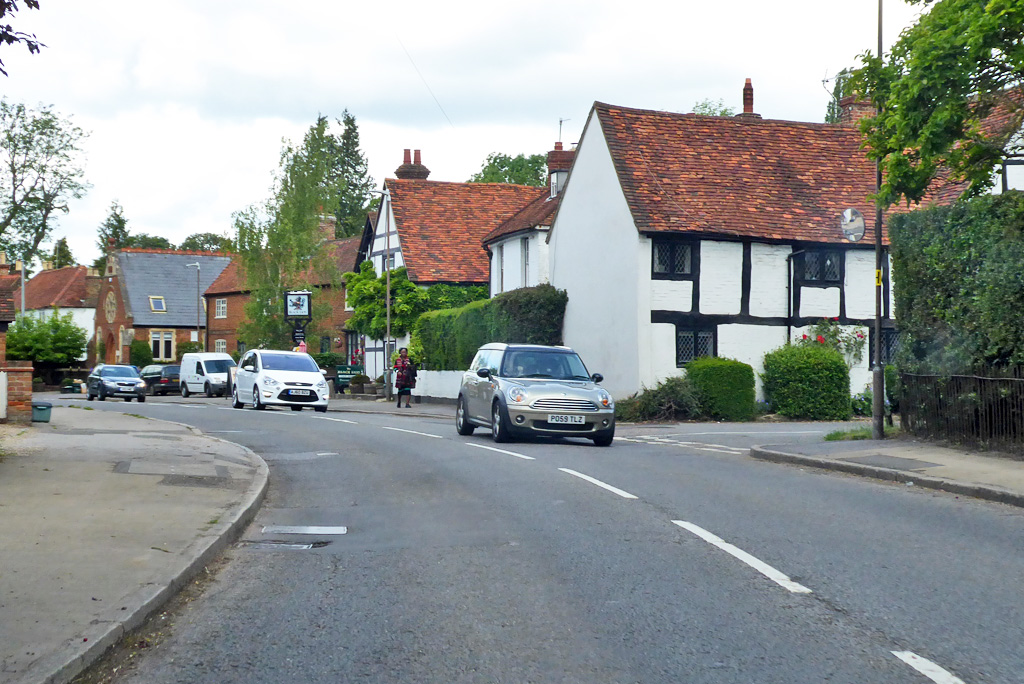
- At Marlow Road

- Location within Buckinghamshire
- Population: 530
- OS grid reference: SU889879
- Civil parish: Little Marlow
- Unitary authority: Buckinghamshire
- Ceremonial county: Buckinghamshire
- Region: South East
- Country: England
- Sovereign state: United Kingdom
- Post town: BOURNE END
- Postcode district: SL8
- Dialling code: 01628
- Police: Thames Valley
- Fire: Buckinghamshire
- Ambulance: South Central
- UK Parliament: Beaconsfield

Well End is a hamlet in the parish of Little Marlow, in Buckinghamshire, England. It is situated on the north-west side of the village of Bourne End. Although it lies in a separate parish, it is geographically contiguous with and subordinate to Bourne End; but unlike most of the hamlets consumed by its larger neighbour, it retains a distinct character, and the use of the name is common and well recognised locally.

The area was once known as Fontibus de Merlow, (Marlow Fountain), of which Well End is a likely etymological derivative.

It is endowed with Abbotsbrook Hall, a small, parish council-owned venue used for community events. The local hostelry is The Black Lion situated on Marlow Road. Claytons School, the junior school serving Well End and Bourne End, is sited locally on Wendover Road. There is nearby access to the Little Marlow Gravel Pits nature reserve and to the River Thames towpath.

Well End was formerly home to a Congregationalist mission hall and The Blacksmiths Arms public house.
