= Wooburn Green =

Village in Buckinghamshire, England

Coordinates: 51.5880°N 0.6831°W

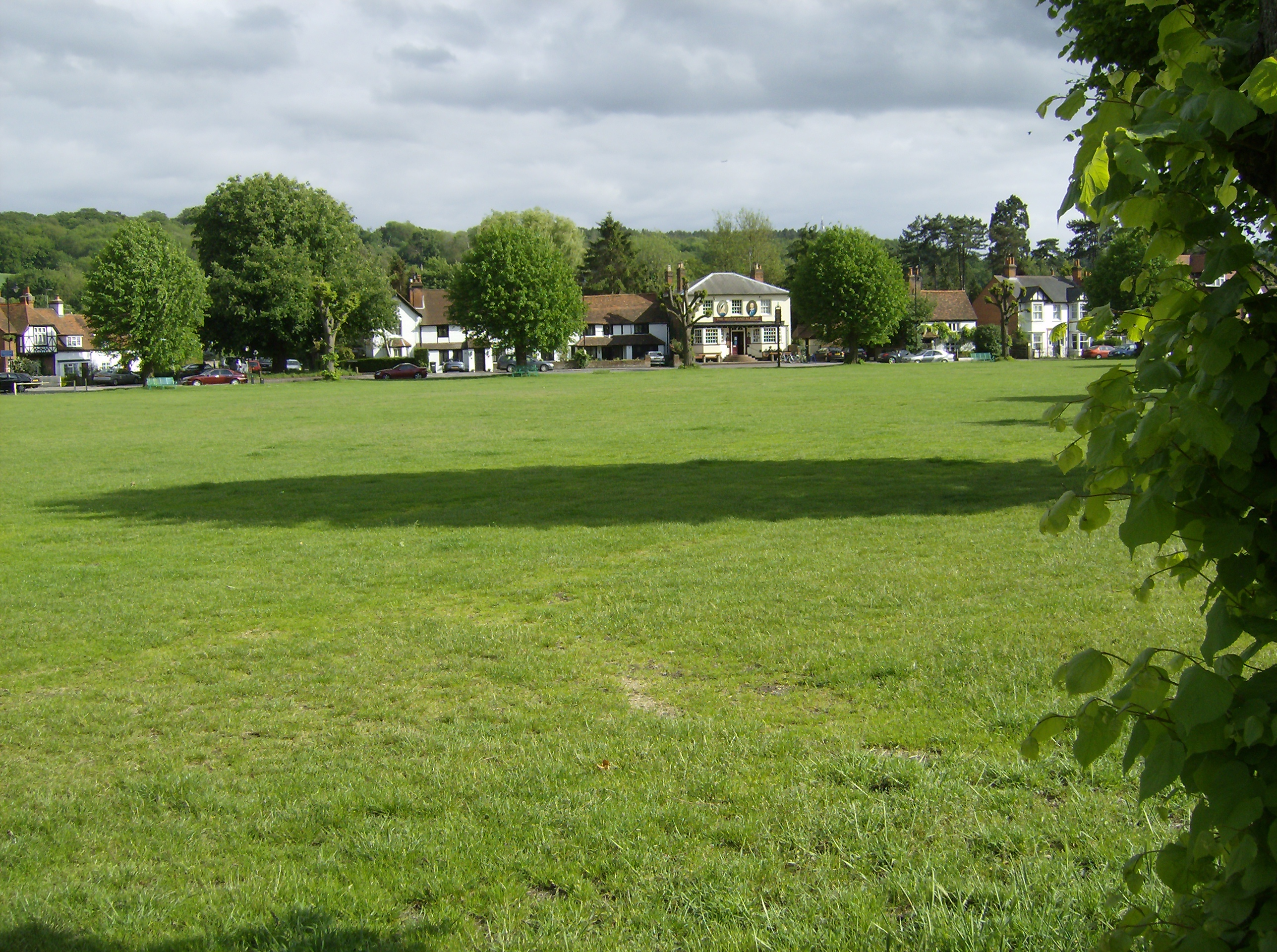
- Wooburn Green

- Location within Buckinghamshire
- Population: 3,820
- OS grid reference: SU913885
- Civil parish: Wooburn
- Unitary authority: Buckinghamshire
- Ceremonial county: Buckinghamshire
- Region: South East
- Country: England
- Sovereign state: United Kingdom
- Post town: HIGH WYCOMBE
- Postcode district: HP10
- Dialling code: 01628
- Police: Thames Valley
- Fire: Buckinghamshire
- Ambulance: South Central
- UK Parliament: Beaconsfield

Wooburn Green is a village in the civil parish of Wooburn, Buckinghamshire, England.

== Location ==
Wooburn Green is a village situated four miles south east of the town of High Wycombe. It neighbours Beaconsfield, Loudwater, Flackwell Heath, Wooburn Common and Bourne End. It is close to the M40 motorway, meaning London and Birmingham are easily accessible by road.

The village was once served by the High Wycombe to Maidenhead railway line; however, the line and station closed in 1970.

== The Green ==
The large village green (a conservation area) is fringed with trees and is surrounded by older cottages, small Victorian and Edwardian houses, modern shops and local businesses. A Village Fête and funfairs are held there regularly throughout the year. During the 1980s, the Green was used to host the Meadows School summer Fete.

1st Wooburn Scout Group meets at their headquarters in Watery Lane, Wooburn Green. You can see the old site of the railway. There are a couple of housing estates which have been built on part of the old railway line.
