= Bourne End Academy =

Location
- New Road; Bourne End, Buckinghamshire, SL8 5BW; England
- 51°34′51″N 0°42′20″W

Information
- Type: Academy
- Motto: Believe, Engage, Aspire
- Local authority: Buckinghamshire
- Department for Education URN: 146518 Tables
- Ofsted: Reports
- Headteacher: L. Cowley
- Gender: Mixed
- Age: 11 to 18
- Enrolment: 850
- Colours: Red and black
- Website: https://bourneendacademy.e-act.org.uk/

Bourne End Academy is a co-educational secondary school in Bourne End, Buckinghamshire, England. It is a secondary school which takes pupils from the age of 11 to 18. It is smaller than an average secondary school, with just over 800 pupils attending every year.

== History ==
Previously known as The Wye Valley School, in September 1998 the school was awarded specialist school status as a Sports College and furthermore, in 2012, the school was awarded the status of a specialist Science College, by the Department for Education and Skills (DfES).

Bourne End Academy transferred to the multi-academy trust E-ACT on 1 September 2018. Pupils from E-ACT Burnham Park Academy, which was officially closed due to falling pupil numbers but E-ACT always had planned on merging the two schools, were offered the opportunity of transferring to Bourne End Academy.

== Facilities ==
Bourne End Academy has a department for students on the autistic spectrum, the ARP (Additional Resources Provision) Department.

== Academic performance and inspections ==
In 2012, Wye Valley achieved 47% A*-C grades (including English and Mathematics) at GCSE with the results below national level placing it in the 4th quantile in comparison to other schools. In 2017, Bourne End Academy achieved 65% A*-C grades (including English and Mathematics) at GCSE. In 2018 the school's GCSE results were -0.28, below average. In 2019 the school's GCSE results declined to -0.49 below average. The latest national performance data from the Department of Education recognises E-ACT Bourne End Academy as the top comprehensive secondary school in Buckinghamshire with 58% of students achieving a Grade 5 or higher in English and Maths.

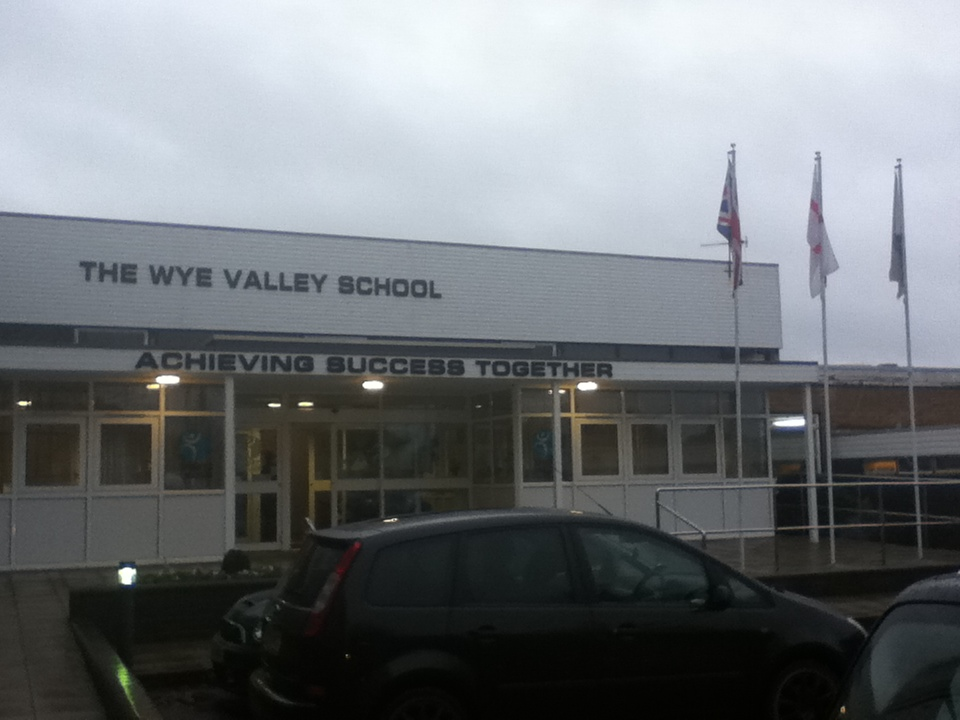
The school's main entrance, on New Road

The school was put into a state of 'Special Measures' after both the school, and its management, were classified as 'Inadequate' by Ofsted in January 2013. After the report, the school's governing body was disbanded, and an interim executive board (IEB) was imposed, which, as of March 2014, was still in place. As of 2017, the school was judged by Ofsted to require improvement but still part of an interim executive board.

As of 2025, the school's most recent inspection by Ofsted was in 2022, with an outcome of Good.

== Sixth form ==
Bourne End Academy has a sixth form for students studying A-levels.
