= River Wye, Buckinghamshire =

River in Buckinghamshire, England

Wye
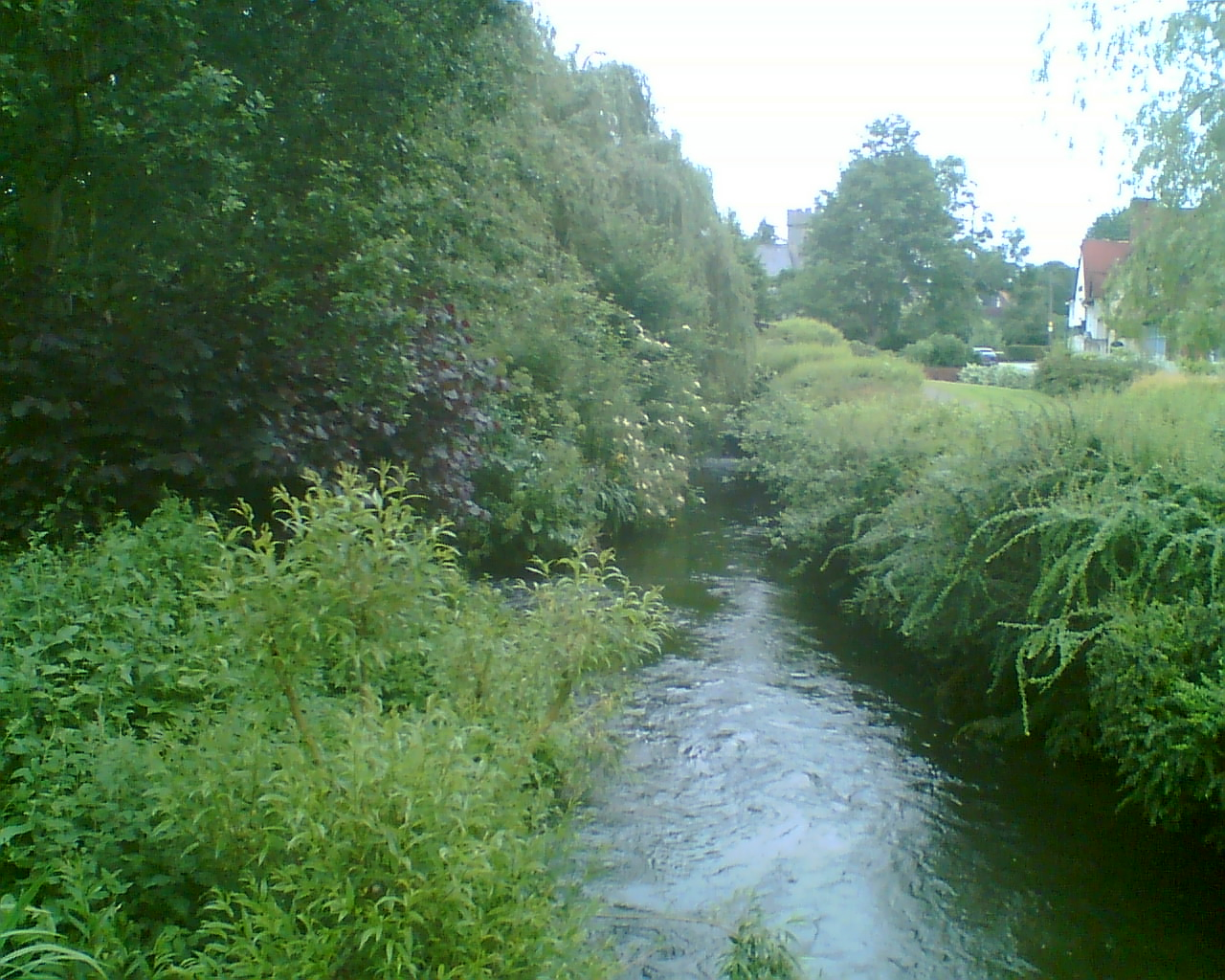
- River Wye near Wooburn Industrial Estate

Location
- Country: England
- Counties: Buckinghamshire
- Towns: High Wycombe, Bourne End

Physical characteristics
- Source
  - location: West Wycombe, Chiltern Hills
  - coordinates: 51°38′52″N 0°48′45″W
  - elevation: 94m
- Mouth: River Thames
  - location: Bourne End
  - coordinates: 51°34′13″N 0°42′40″W
  - elevation: 26m
- Length: 17 km (11 mi)
- Discharge
  - location: Hedsor
  - average: 1.00 m^{3}/s (35 cu ft/s)
  - minimum: 0.25 m^{3}/s (8.8 cu ft/s)25 December 1973
  - maximum: 4.40 m^{3}/s (155 cu ft/s)25 September 1981
- Discharge
  - location: High Wycombe
  - average: 0.31 m^{3}/s (11 cu ft/s)

The River Wye is a chalk river in Buckinghamshire, England. It takes its name from the town of High Wycombe through which it flows, rather than the town being named after the river, as is more commonly the case.

Around 10.5 miles (16.9 km) in length, the Wye rises close to West Wycombe village in the Chiltern Hills and flows through High Wycombe, where it is fed from other tributataries such as Hughenden Stream, before emptying into the River Thames at Bourne End, on the reach above Cookham Lock. In particularly wet years, the source can temporarily change and effectively extend the river by another mile, due to a chalk spring rising above the ground in a field further up the same valley. The River Wye now runs in underground culverts through the centre of High Wycombe. Pann Mill watermill, at the eastern end of Wycombe, is the last remaining watermill on the river.

== History ==
There is a long history of water-mills being operated in the Wye Valley which drops about 220 feet (67 m) in its 10.5-mile (16.9 km) course. The Domesday Book records eighteen of them in the nine miles between West Wycombe and the Thames. By the seventeenth century there were fulling mills as well as corn mills. A Court of Survey in 1627 lists six mills running upstream from the boundary with Wooburn Parish: the paper mill, Tredway, Loudwater, Bassetsbury, Chalfonts (Rye) and Bridge. There were by this time at least two paper mills: Glory in Wooburn Green and Hedge in Loudwater. By 1636 another paper mill had been established in the parish of West Wycombe and by 1656 another at Marsh, below Wycombe. At this time paper was made from rags and by the end of the eighteenth century more than 150 men were recorded as papermakers in the valley. In 1816 there were 32 paper mills (some of which also milled corn), four which only milled corn and one which was also a saw mill. This was when paper making reached its peak in the valley. However, the introduction of the Fourdrinier machine at the nearby Frogmore Paper Mill, which produced a continuous roll of paper, led to widespread unemployment and many families went to the cotton mills of Lancashire. In 1830 there were riots when machine wreckers broke the machines at Ash, Marsh Green and Loudwater. Twenty men were punished by penal transportation to Tasmania.

Papermaking continued at the Soho and Glory mills till the end of the twentieth century, though the water-mills gave way to steam in the mid-nineteenth century. The Soho mill in Wooburn was the prime supplier of high-grade colour paper till its demise in 1984.

== Mills ==
Shown in order from highest to lowest. Note that Marsh Green to Treadway are on an extra cut parallel to Pan to Loudwater Mills. The number is that given by registration in the eighteenth century.

Name	Recorded	Last record	No	Type	OS Ref
West Wycombe Mill	1311	1900~		sawmill (18thC)	SU 8373 9415
Upper, Francis or Little Mill	1681	1903	423	paper	SU 8443 9400
Lower, Mill End or Fryer's Mill	1505	1915	422	Corn & paper	SU 8490 9384
Lord, Frog or Ball Mill	1717	1883	421	Corn & paper	SU 8550 9363
Ash or Lane's Mill (Broughton/Wynkle's) (2)	1596	1895	419, 420	paper	SU 8600 9339
Temple Mill (Gosenham)	1227	1895		corn	SU 8631 9315
Bridge Mill	1185	1932		corn	SU 8653 9290
Pann Mill	1185	1967		corn	SU 8705 9276
Rye Mill (Bradshaw's, Sale's, Bowler's, New)	1346	1931	411	paper	SU 8746 9260
Bassetbury Mill	1411	1931		corn	SU 8771 9240
Bowden Mill (2)	1235	1939	415, 416	Corn & paper	SU 8830 9220
Wycombe Marsh Mill (Lower Marsh)	1133	1993	414	paper	SU 8880 9195
King's Mill (New)	1725	1939	417	paper	SU 8746 9260
Loudwater Mill (2)	1483	1939	430, 431	paper	SU 9014 9079
Snakely or Ford's Mill	1767	1970	428	paper	SU 9027 9036
Hedge Mill	1235	1970	427	Corn & paper	SU 9042 9012
Marsh Green or Upper Marsh Mill	1750	1816	412	Corn & paper	SU 8790 9212
Beech Mill	1740	1900	413	paper	SU 8881 9155
Treadway Mill (Overshot's)	1682	1854	418	Corn & paper	SU 8999 9056
Clapton Mill	1492	1922	429, 509	Corn, metal & paper	SU 9100 8997
Glory Mill (2)	1235	2000	426	Corn & paper	SU 9130 8950
Lower Glory Mill	1631	1907	425	Corn & paper	SU 9160 8895
Soho Mill	1705	1988	424	Corn & paper	SU 9080 8770
Prince's Mill (Egham Green) (3)	1730	1865	287, 288, 289	Corn & paper	SU 9009 8736
Gunpowder Mill (Jackson's)	1705	1980	286	Corn & paper	SU 8978 8717
Hedsor Mill	1492	1980	285	Corn & paper	SU 8962 8670
Lower Bourne End Mill	1719	1895	284	Corn & paper	SU 8948 8643

== See also ==
- Tributaries of the River Thames
- List of rivers of England

Next confluence upstream	River Thames	Next confluence downstream
Hennerton Backwater	River Wye, Buckinghamshire	York Stream (south)
