= Little Marlow =

Village in Buckinghamshire, England

Coordinates: 51.585°N 0.741°W

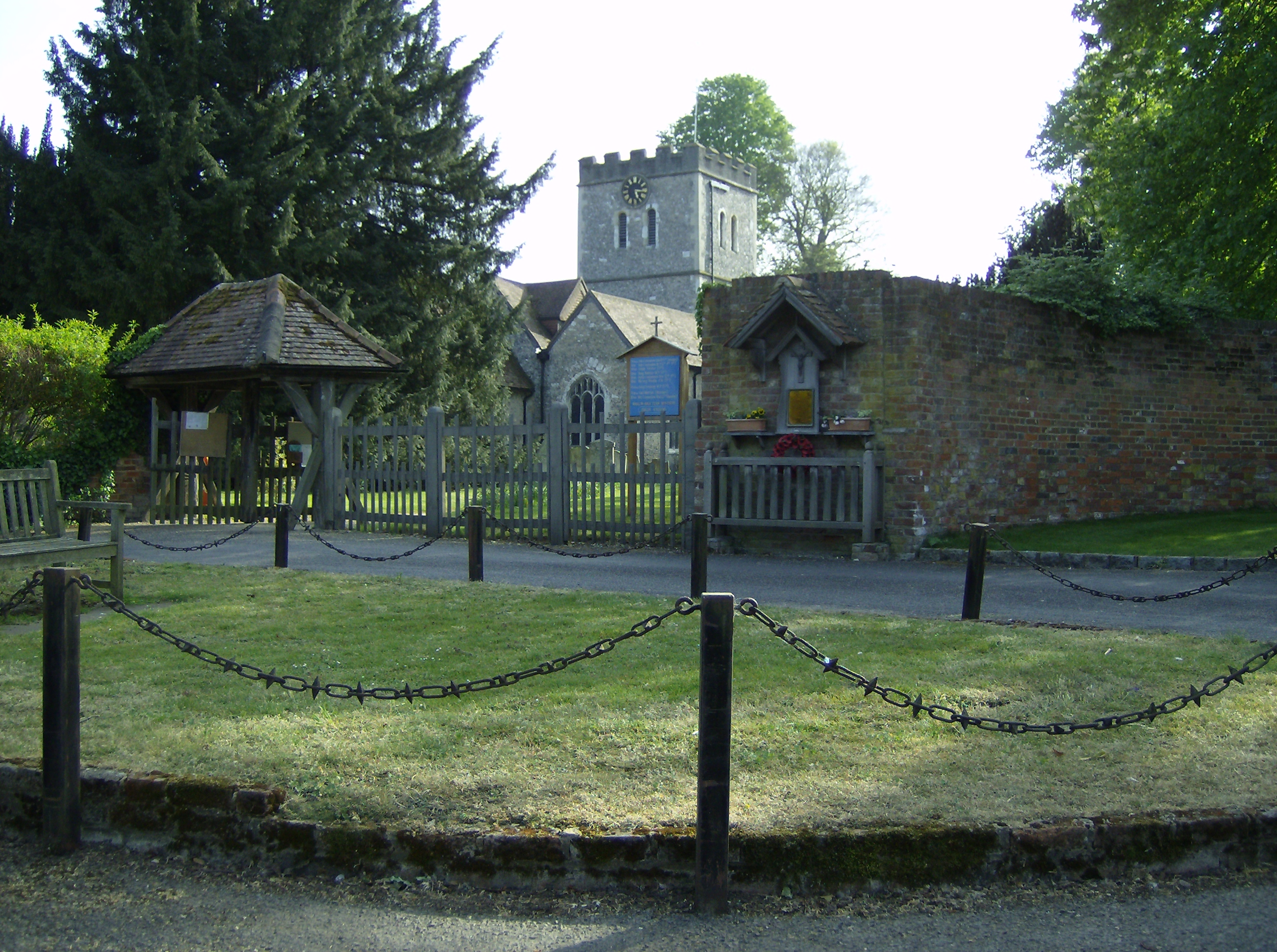
- St John the Baptist parish church

- Location within Buckinghamshire
- Population: 1,331; 1,438 (2011 Census)
- OS grid reference: SU8788
- Civil parish: Little Marlow
- Unitary authority: Buckinghamshire
- Ceremonial county: Buckinghamshire
- Region: South East
- Country: England
- Sovereign state: United Kingdom
- Post town: Marlow
- Postcode district: SL7
- Dialling code: 01628
- Police: Thames Valley
- Fire: Buckinghamshire
- Ambulance: South Central
- UK Parliament: Beaconsfield

Little Marlow is a village and civil parish in Buckinghamshire, England.

== History ==
The Church of England parish church of Saint John the Baptist lies at the heart of the village, not far from the river and next to the Manor House. The original construction of the church is Norman, dating from the final years of the 12th century. Construction continued during the 14th, 15th, and early 16th centuries.

Little Marlow was once the site of Little Marlow Priory, a Benedictine priory dedicated to the Blessed Virgin Mary. In 1536 during the Dissolution of the Monasteries, it was transferred to Bisham Abbey, which was, in turn, dissolved in 1538. The priory’s conventual hall stood until 1740 when it was demolished.

Today the village is in a scenic location on the River Thames, although home to a large sewage works, with exceptional birdwatching habitats on the lakes created from former gravel extraction sites.

There are two public houses in the village: the Kings Head and the Queens Head.

== Geography ==
Little Marlow is located along the north bank of the River Thames, about a mile east of Marlow and is surrounded by Little Marlow Lakes Country Park.

The toponym "Marlow" is derived from the Old English for "land remaining after the draining of a pool".

Hamlets in the parish of Little Marlow include Coldmoorholme, Fern, Handy Cross, Sheepridge, and Winchbottom.

The village cottages are set around a large space, surrounded by lime trees, that is used as a cricket ground and village green where an annual fête is held.

== Culture ==
Little Marlow appears briefly in Mary Shelley's 1826 science fiction novel The Last Man, in a sequence where the novel's protagonist recounts how the village's residents went about trying to prevent themselves from falling ill with the plague.

Mel B was a one-time resident of Little Marlow.

In 2021, Little Marlow was used as a temporary filming location for the Star Wars series Andor.
