= Bourne End, Buckinghamshire =

Village in Buckinghamshire England

Coordinates: 51.581737°N 0.713382°W

Bourne End
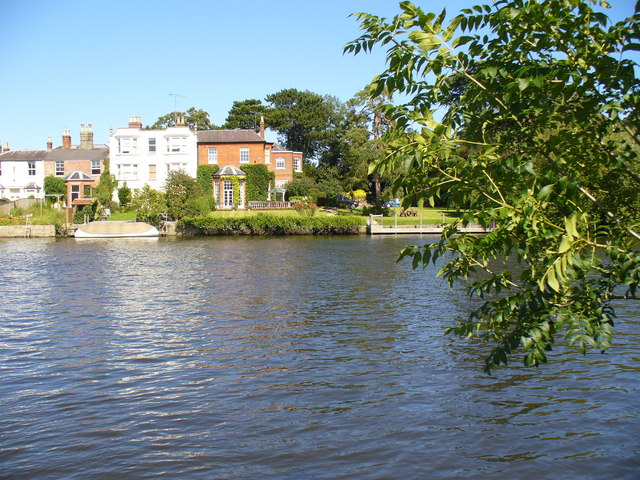
- Georgian and Victorian houses, downstream from Bourne End Marina

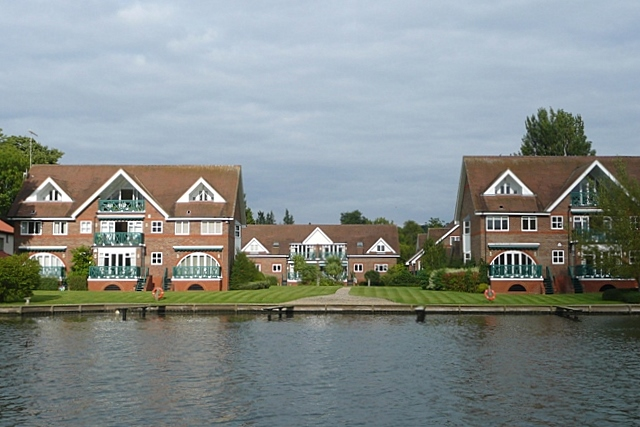
- 21st century development by the Thames

- Location within Buckinghamshire
- Population: 7,166
- OS grid reference: SU895875
- Civil parish: Wooburn
- Unitary authority: Buckinghamshire
- Ceremonial county: Buckinghamshire
- Region: South East
- Country: England
- Sovereign state: United Kingdom
- Post town: BOURNE END
- Postcode district: SL8
- Dialling code: 01628
- Police: Thames Valley
- Fire: Buckinghamshire
- Ambulance: South Central
- UK Parliament: Beaconsfield

Bourne End is a village mostly in the parish of Wooburn, but partly in that of Little Marlow in Buckinghamshire, England. It is about five miles (8 km) south-east of High Wycombe and three miles (5 km) east of Marlow, near the boundary with Berkshire and close to where the Buckinghamshire River Wye empties into the Thames.

== History ==
Bourne End's original location differed from today's established village centre, and was a half-mile downstream on the River Thames. The name refers to the end of the river (bourne being an obsolete term for river), and derived from the mouth of the River Wye. Then a hamlet, it appears on Morden's 1722 map of Buckinghamshire as "Born end". It was noted in the 19th century, however, that the name had been corrupted to "Bone End", apparently through local mispronunciation and thence on official maps and documents. In 1858, the vicar of Wooburn succeeded in reversing the change, and the corrected name remains in use today.

The length of the River Wye was the provider of water power for many mills in the valley for hundreds of years, and Bourne End was no exception. There were four on the final stretch of the river: Princes Mill, Jacksons (or Gunpowder) Mill, Hedsor Mill and Lower Mill. These mills were historically the predominant employers in the area, along with the local farms and two wharfs on the Thames.

In the early nineteenth century, the settlement known as Bourne End was a hamlet of Wooburn parish, along with others such as Spring Gardens, Eghams Green, Cores End, Heavens Lea and Upper Bourne End. This changed with the emergence of the Wycombe Railway Company in 1846. By 1854, Isambard Kingdom Brunel had designed and constructed a railway linking Maidenhead to High Wycombe, via Bourne End. The station at Bourne End was originally named Marlow Road; then in 1873 a branch line to Marlow was built, and a year later the station was renamed Bourne End station to avoid confusion with the new station at Marlow town. The railway created more travel opportunities for locals and greatly benefited the mills, and thus Bourne End expanded, on a greater scale than other similar settlements in the surrounding area. See Marlow Branch Line and Marlow Donkey for more information.

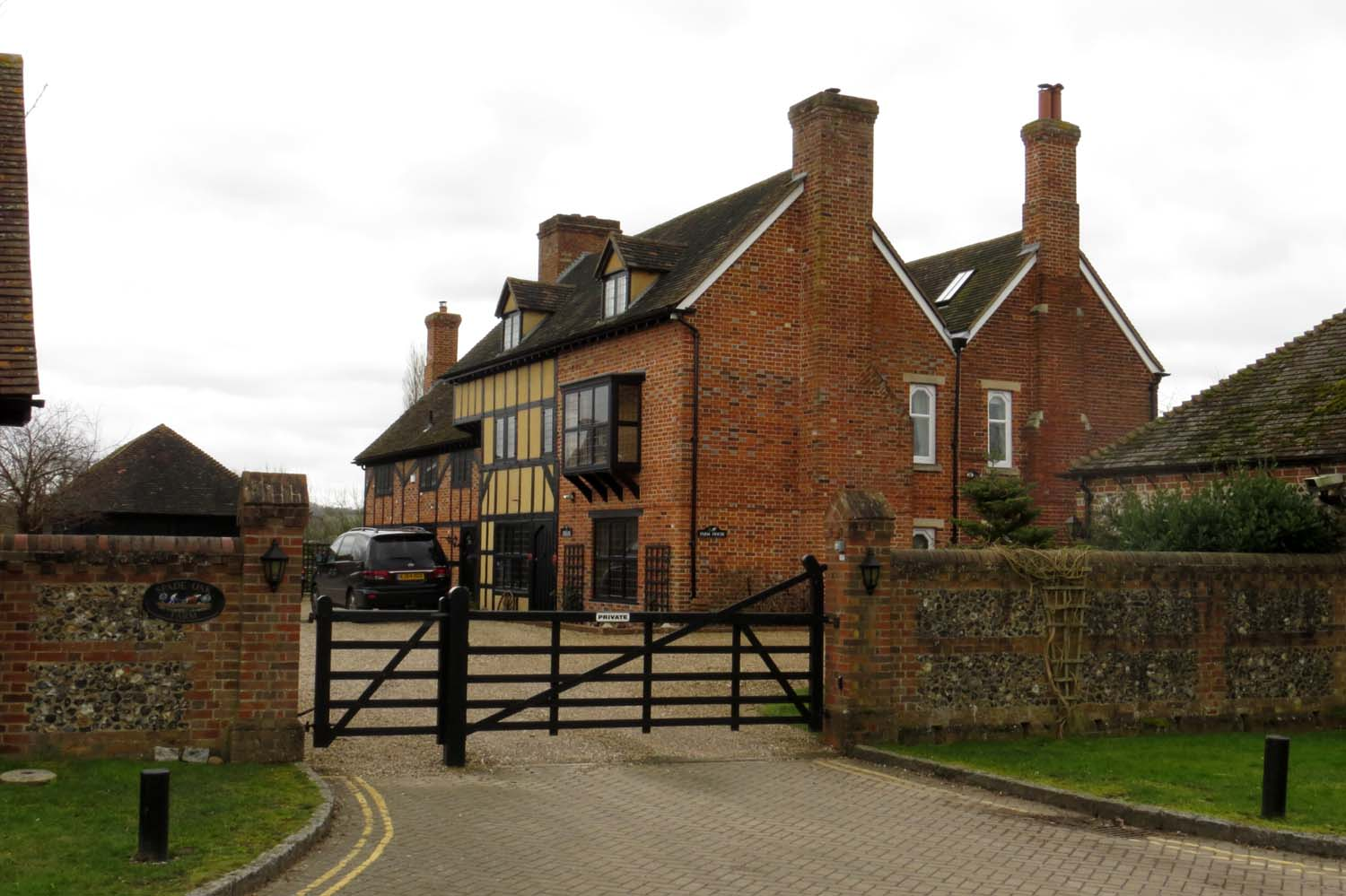
Spade Oak Farm on Coldmoreholme Lane

The hamlets soon merged into what is now known as Bourne End, as did Well End and Coldmoorholme (or Coldmoorholm, formerly Coldmoorham or Coldmorham) in the neighbouring parish of Little Marlow. Locally, the area of Coldmoorholm is known as 'Spade Oak'. Both a church and school were built at the turn of the century for the residents' convenience. The Parade became established as the focal point of the village for shops and services.

In the 1920s Bourne End became home for two distinguished literary figures; Enid Blyton, a perennially popular children's writer, moved into Old Thatch on Coldmoorholme Lane, and Edgar Wallace, a prolific crime author and dramatist, bought Chalklands off Blind Lane. Another resident at this time was Louis Blériot, the French aviator and aircraft builder, who lived at New York Lodge beside the Thames.

The Royalty Cinema opened in The Parade in 1934. The late 1940s saw extensive development in Bourne End, of the Chalklands estate and the Council Estate north of The Parade. The 1960s saw the building of the Community Centre and Library in Wakeman Road after some years of local campaigning.

The Beeching Axe hit the village in 1969, as it was announced that the line between Bourne End and High Wycombe, which had suffered reduced usage after the direct connection between Wycombe and London by the opening of the Great Western and Great Central Joint Railway in 1899, would be closed. The track bed was lifted soon after closure in 1970. A commercial estate was developed adjacent to the station, though most of the course taken by the railway remains as a footpath between the village and Wooburn.

== Geography ==
=== Locale ===
Bourne End lies between the M4 and M40 motorways, and retains its railway station on the Maidenhead to Marlow Branch Line. With rail and road accessibility to London, it has become a popular place for commuters to live.

All of the mills along the Wye Valley have now been shut down and demolished, Jacksons Mill in Furlong Road being the last (in Bourne End) in the late 1980s. These have been replaced by houses, offices or industrial estates, which has led to the continuation of the village as an employment centre.

Bourne End remains a distinct settlement, although the continued house-building over the past century means it is threatened by the evident ribbon development, through to High Wycombe. In 1997, when the Local Plan was in preparation, the Residents Associations of Bourne End and Wooburn lobbied to stop Slate Meadow (the field which separates the two settlements) being designated for housing for the time being. A new plan was approved in July 2019 and construction commenced until the discovery of 4,000 year old flint tools and an aurochs bone on the site. Other undeveloped land around the village looks likely to remain so, as it has been specified as Green Belt, an Area of Outstanding Natural Beauty, a Site of Special Scientific Interest, or a combination of the three. In parts, Bourne End is surrounded by farmland. Somewhat further away, Cliveden and Hedsor overlook the village from higher ground to the south east.

=== Community ===
Bourne End sustains many businesses and services whilst still retaining a village atmosphere. There is a Community Centre in the centre of the village, with a large hall, function rooms and a bar, which is open for member's use. It is, for many, considered the focal point of village activity.

In the early 2000s, a Twinning Association was established, and subsequently Octeville-sur-Mer, a town on the north coast of France, was chosen to be its twin town. Frequent events are held by members of the association to foster and enhance the relationship between the two settlements.

=== Administration and services ===
The local government of the village is made up of two tiers. Wooburn and Bourne End Parish Council (formerly Wooburn Parish Council, until 2005), based in Wooburn; and Buckinghamshire Council, based in Aylesbury which was established as a unitary authority in 2020. The local police force is Thames Valley Police. Local healthcare services are commissioned by the Arc Bucks Primary Care Network; GPs operate the Bourne End & Wooburn Green Medical Centre which includes the Hawthornden Surgery in Wharf Lane, The Orchard Surgery in Station Road and the Pound House Surgery at Wooburn Green. Nurses and other medical staff operate between all three. There are two dentists, the Bourne End Dental Practice, and Advance Dental Services, both in Station Road.

== Leisure ==
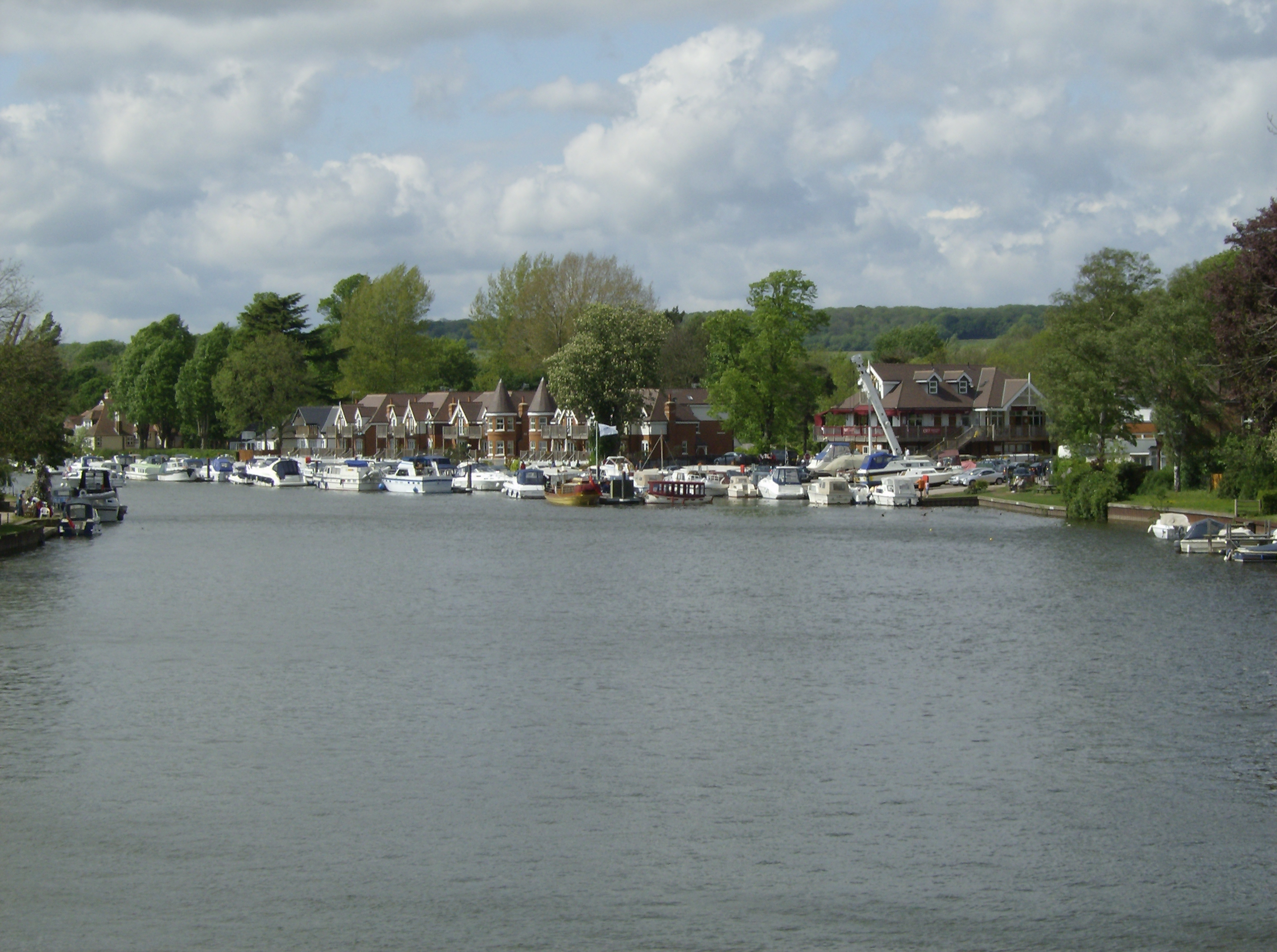
Bourne End Marina on the River Thames

The village has two recreation grounds (Furlong Road and Blind Lane), riverside open space at the marina and Spade Oak Reach, a Junior Sports Club and fitness centre and the long-established Upper Thames Sailing Club. For many residents and visitors alike, the river is the central attraction of Bourne End, and many leisure pursuits involve or revolve around it. The Sailing Club traditionally host a week-long regatta every year in June, known as Bourne End Week.

Bourne End hosts a number of restaurants of varying cuisines. There are also a number of public houses.

Near Bourne End, across the River Thames, is Cock Marsh, an area of common land and floodplain owned by the National Trust. It is a Site of Special Scientific Interest and includes a prehistoric burial mound. Cock Marsh is accessible via the footbridge attached to the railway bridge over the river, and footpaths continue to Cookham, Cookham Dean and beyond.

The Thames Path National Trail follows the River Thames through Bourne End; upstream on the Buckinghamshire side, crossing the river at the footbridge, and downstream through Berkshire.

== Education ==
Bourne End has three schools:

- Westfield School, on Highfield Road, a special school which was the village First School until 1995.
- Claytons Primary School, in Wendover Road, the village junior school which was formerly a Middle School which was merged with Westfield.
- Bourne End Academy, in New Road, an upper school which has specialist Sports College status. Before its amalgamation with Pembroke School, Flackwell Heath, in 1985, this was known as Deyncourt School, and subsequently as Wye Valley School until 2014. From late 2012 to late 2014, the school was suffering from poor results in OFSTED evaluations, and was ultimately placed into Special Measures and given the academy status.

There are a number of pre-schools and nurseries across the village.

== Religion ==
The village currently has three active churches. The Anglican parish church, in Station Road, is dedicated to St Mark. It was built in 1889 as a daughter church of St Paul's, Wooburn. The Roman Catholic church of St Dunstan is in the centre of the village, off Cores End Road. The longest established is the United Reformed Church in Cores End, which was founded as a Congregational Chapel in 1773, as a nonconformist alternative to St Paul's in Wooburn.

Bourne End had a Methodist Church in Furlong Road, which closed in 2002. Well End once had a Congregational mission hall, in the late 19th and early 20th centuries; this is now a residential house named The Chapel.

Bourne End also has the only UK branch of the Ramakrishna Mission, Ramakrishna Vedanta centre .

== Shopping ==
Bourne End has some shops, chiefly in The Parade. Community events focused on the village centre, such as "Fun Night" in December, have attempted to turn residents' attention to upholding local trade and businesses. There is a small parade of shops in Furlong Road, including the main Post Office.

== Noted inhabitants ==
- Louis Blériot (1872–1936), French aviator, inventor, and engineer.
- Enid Blyton (1897–1968), English children’s writer
- Sir Bernard Chacksfield (1913–1999) Royal Air Force officer.
- Bud Flanagan (1896–1968), British music hall and vaudeville entertainer and comedian)
- Sir Arthur Harden FRS (1865–1940), Nobel Prize-winning biochemist
- Renée Houston 1902–1980), Scottish comedy actress and revue artist
- Beatrix Lehmann (1903–1979), British actress, theatre directress, writer and novelist.
- John Lehmann (1907–1987), poet, publisher, man of letters.
- Rosamond Lehmann (1901–1990), novelist and translator
- Edgar Wallace (1875–1932), Crime writer, war correspondent, journalist, novelist, screenwriter, and playwright.
