= List of places in Buckinghamshire =

Main settlements of Buckinghamshire

This is a list of places in the ceremonial county of Buckinghamshire, England. It does not include places which were formerly in Buckinghamshire. For places which were in Buckinghamshire until 1974, and were then transferred to Berkshire, and other places transferred from Buckinghamshire since 1844, see list of Buckinghamshire boundary changes.

== A ==
Settlement	Population	Settlement type	Local Authority	Image	Notes
Ackhampstead		Hamlet (in Great Marlow civil parish)	Buckinghamshire		
Addingrove		Hamlet (in Brill and Oakley civil parishes]	Buckinghamshire		Site of Deserted Medieval Village
Addington	145	Village and civil parish	Buckinghamshire		
Adstock	363	Village and civil parish	Buckinghamshire		
Akeley	514	Village and civil parish	Buckinghamshire		Civil parish includes hamlet of Stockholt
Alscot		Hamlet (in Princes Risborough parish)	Buckinghamshire		
Amersham	14,384	Town and civil parish	Buckinghamshire		
Ascott		Hamlet (in Wing civil parish)	Buckinghamshire		
Ashendon	249	Village and civil parish	Buckinghamshire		Civil parish includes hamlets of Lower Pollicott and Upper Pollicott
Asheridge		Hamlet (in Chartridge civil parish)	Buckinghamshire		
Ashland		District of Milton Keynes (in Simpson and Ashland civil parish)	City of Milton Keynes		
Ashley Green	980	Village and civil parish	Buckinghamshire		Civil parish includes hamlet of Whelpley Hill
Askett		Hamlet (in Princes Risborough parish)	Buckinghamshire		
Aston Abbotts	366	Village and civil parish	Buckinghamshire		
Aston Clinton	3,682	Village and civil parish	Buckinghamshire		Civil parish includes hamlets of Chivery and Vaches
Aston Mullins		Hamlet (in Dinton-with-Ford and Upton civil parish)	Buckinghamshire		Site of Deserted Medieval Village
Aston Sandford	43	Village and civil parish	Buckinghamshire		
Astwood	365	Village and civil parish	City of Milton Keynes		
Atterbury		District of Milton Keynes (in Middleton civil parish)	Buckinghamshire		
Austenwood		Hamlet (in Chalfont St Peter civil parish)	Buckinghamshire		
Aylesbury	74,748	Large town and civil parish, county town of Buckinghamshire,	Buckinghamshire		58,740 in the town and 74,748 in the Urban Area

Note: Population normally available for civil parishes, unavailable for constituent villages and hamlets

== B ==
Settlement	Population	Settlement type	Local authority	Image	Notes
Baker's Wood		Hamlet (in Denham civil parish)	South Bucks District		
Ballinger		Hamlet (in Great Missenden civil parish)	Chiltern District		
Ballinger Bottom		Area within Ballinger	Chiltern District		
Ballinger Common		Common within Ballinger	Chiltern District		
Bancroft		District in Milton Keynes (in Stantonbury civil parish	City of Milton Keynes		
Bancroft Park		District in Milton Keynes (in Stantonbury civil parish	City of Milton Keynes		
Barley End		Hamlet (in Pitstone civil parish)	Aylesbury Vale		
Barton Hartshorn	88	Village and civil parish	Aylesbury Vale		
Beachampton	184	Village and civil parish	Aylesbury Vale		
Beachendon		Former hamlet	Aylesbury Vale (in Waddesdon civil parish		Deserted Medieval hamlet
Beacon Hill		Hamlet (in Penn civil parish)	Chiltern District		
Beacon's Bottom		Hamlet (in Stokenchurch civil parish)	Chiltern District		
Beaconsfield	12,081	Market town and civil parish	South Bucks District		Civil parish includes Holtspur and hamlet of Ledborough
Beamond End		Hamlet (in Little Missenden civil parish)	Chiltern District		
Beanhill		District in Milton Keynes (in Woughton civil parish)	City of Milton Keynes		
Bedgrove	9,171	Housing estate in Aylesbury	Aylesbury Vale		
Bellingdon		Village (in Chartridge civil parish)	Chiltern District		
Bennett End		Hamlet (in Radnage civil parish)	Wycombe District		
Berghers Hill	80	Hamlet (in Wooburn and Bourne End civil parish)	Wycombe District		
Berryfields		Major housing development in Aylesbury	Aylesbury Vale		
Biddlesden	113	Village and civil parish	Aylesbury Vale		
Bierton	2,178	Village (in Bierton with Broughton civil parish)	Aylesbury Vale		
Bierton with Broughton		Civil parish	Aylesbury Vale		Civil parish includes villages of Bierton and hamlets of Broughton, Broughton Crossing and Burcott
Bishopstone	275	Village (in Stone with Bishopstone and Hartwell civil parish)	Aylesbury Vale		
Bledlow		Village (in Bledlow-cum-Saunderton civil parish)	Wycombe District		
Bledlow-cum-Saunderton	2,249	Civil parish	Wycombe District		Civil parish includes villages of Bledlow, Bledlow Ridge and Saunderton, also hamlets of Crownfield, Forty Green in Bledlow, Holly Green, Pitch Green, Rout's Green, Saunderton Lee and Skittle Green
Bledlow Ridge	940	Village (in Bledlow-cum-Saunderton civil parish)	Wycombe District		
Bletchley	33,950	Town (in Bletchley and Fenny Stratford civil parish)	City of Milton Keynes		Part of Milton Keynes since 1967. Population figure is for the "Bletchley built-up sub-area", which covers Bletchley and Fenny Stratford and West Bletchley civil parishes.
Bletchley and Fenny Stratford	15,313	Civil parish with town council	City of Milton Keynes		Civil parish includes Bletchley, Brickfields, Central Bletchley, Denbigh (Denbigh North, Denbigh East and Denbigh West), Fenny Lock, Fenny Stratford, Granby, Mount Farm, Newton Leys and Water Eaton
Boarstall	128	Village and civil parish	Aylesbury Vale		Civil parish includes hamlet of Honeyburge
Bockmer End		Hamlet (in Medmenham civil parish)	Wycombe District		
Bolter End		Hamlet (in Lane End civil parish)	Wycombe District		
Booker		Hamlet (in West Wycombe civil parish)	Wycombe District		
Botley		Hamlet (in Chesham civil parish)	Chiltern District		
Botolph Claydon		Hamlet (in East Claydon civil parish)	Aylesbury Vale		
Bottrells Close		Hamlet (in Chalfont St Giles civil parish)	Chiltern District		
Bourne End	5,320	Village (in Wooburn and Bourne End and Little Marlow civil parishes)	Wycombe District		(within High Wycombe Urban Area)
Bourton		Hamlet (in Buckingham civil parish)	Aylesbury Vale		Now an integral part of Buckingham
Boveney		Village (in Burnham civil parish)	South Bucks District		Most southerly village in Buckinghamshire
Bovingdon Green		Hamlet (in Great Marlow civil parish)	Wycombe District		
Bow Brickhill	562	Village and civil parish	City of Milton Keynes		
Bowerdean		Suburb of High Wycombe	Wycombe District		
Boycott		Hamlet (in Stowe civil parish)	Aylesbury Vale		
Bradenham	722	Village and civil parish	Wycombe District		Civil parish includes village of Walters Ash
Bradville		District in Stantonbury civil parish, contiguous with New Bradwell.	City of Milton Keynes		
Bradwell	9,657	Village, district and civil parish	City of Milton Keynes		Civil parish includes Bradwell, Bradwell Common, Bradwell Abbey, Heelands, Hodge Lea, Kiln Farm, Two Mile Ash, Rooksley, Stacey Bushes and Wymbush
Bradwell Abbey	6,644	District (in Bradwell civil parish)	City of Milton Keynes		A former civil parish used this name.
Bradwell Common		District (in Bradwell civil parish)	City of Milton Keynes		
Bragenham		Hamlet (in Soulbury civil parish)	Aylesbury Vale		
Brays Green		Hamlet (in Little Missenden civil parish)	Chiltern District		
Brickfields		District (in Bletchley and Fenny Stratford civil parish)	City of Milton Keynes		
Brill	1,141	Village and civil parish	Aylesbury Vale		Civil parish includes hamlet Little London, Brill
Brinklow		District (in Kents Hill and Monkston civil parish)	City of Milton Keynes		
Broughton, in Milton Keynes	2,493	Village and civil parish	City of Milton Keynes		As of 2023, a joint CP with Milton Keynes (civil parish)
Broughton, near Aylesbury		Hamlet (in Bierton with Broughton civil parish)	Aylesbury Vale		Also the name of a nearby housing estate in Aylesbury
Broughton Crossing		Hamlet / Small settlement (in Bierton with Broughton civil parish)	Aylesbury Vale		
Bryant's Bottom		Settlement (in Great Missenden civil parish)	Chiltern District		
Buckingham	12,043	Town and civil parish	Aylesbury Vale		Civil parish includes hamlet of Bourton and suburbs of Castle Fields, Mount Pleasant and Page Hill
Buckingham Park	1,748	Suburban residential neighbourhood and civil parish	Aylesbury Vale		Contiguous with Aylesbury
Buckland	713	Village and civil parish	Aylesbury Vale		Civil parish includes hamlet of Buckland Wharf
Buckland Common		Hamlet (in Cholesbury-cum-St Leonards civil parish)	Chiltern District		
Buckland Wharf		Hamlet (in Buckland civil parish)	Aylesbury Vale		
Buffler's Holt		Hamlet (in Buckingham civil parish)	Aylesbury Vale		
Burcott, near Bierton		Hamlet (in Bierton with Broughton civil parish)	Aylesbury Vale		
Burcott, near Wing		Hamlet (in Wing civil parish)	Aylesbury Vale		
Burnham	11,630	Village and civil parish	South Bucks District		Civil parish includes villages of Boveney, Burnham and Hitcham; hamlets of Egypt and Littleworth; village districts of East Burnham, Lent Rise and Rose Hill and area of Littleworth Common
Burroughs Grove		Hamlet (in Great Marlow civil parish)	Wycombe District		
Burston		Hamlet (in Wingrave civil parish)	Aylesbury Vale		
Butlers Cross		Hamlet ( in Ellesborough civil parish)	Wycombe District		
Bye Green		Hamlet ( in Weston Turville civil parish)	Aylesbury Vale		

Note: Population normally available for civil parishes, unavailable for constituent villages and hamlets

== C ==
Settlement	Population	Settlement type	Local authority	Image	Notes
Cadmore		Village (in Lane End civil parish)	Wycombe District		Also known as Cadmore End
Cadsden		Hamlet (in Princes Risborough civil parish)	Wycombe District		Comprising Lower Cadsden and Upper Cadsden
Caldicot		Ancient village (in Aylesbury civil parish)	Aylesbury Vale		In Bedgrove housing estate
Caldecote		Hamlet (in Newport Pagnell civil parish)	City of Milton Keynes		
Caldecotte		District and former hamlet (in Walton civil parish)	City of Milton Keynes		part of Milton Keynes
California		Hamlet (in Aylesbury civil parish)	Aylesbury Vale		Contiguous with Aylesbury town
Calvert		Village (in Calvert Green civil parish)	Aylesbury Vale		
Calvert Green	403	Civil parish	Aylesbury Vale		Civil parish includes village of Calvert
Calverton	197	Civil parish	City of Milton Keynes		Civil parish includes hamlets of Upper Weald, Middle Weald and Lower Weald
Campbell Park		District (in Central Milton Keynes)	City of Milton Keynes		District includes the Grade II listed park. This district is not part of Campbell Park (civil parish).
Campbell Park (civil parish)	13,364	District and Civil parish	City of Milton Keynes		Civil parish includes the Fishermead, Oldbrook, Springfield, Winterhill, and The Woolstones grid-squares and villages of Great Woolstone, Little Woolstone and Willen, but not Campbell Park itself
Castle Fields		Suburb of Buckingham town (in Buckingham civil parish)	Aylesbury Vale		
Castlefield		Suburb of High Wycombe	Wycombe District		
Castlethorpe	1,047	Village and civil parish	City of Milton Keynes		
Central Milton Keynes	2,726	Civil parish with a town council	City of Milton Keynes		The central business district and central leisure facilities of Milton Keynes. It is bounded by Portway (A509 road), the West Coast Main Line railway, Childsway, and the Grand Union Canal. It includes Campbell Park.
Chackmore	236	Hamlet (in Radclive-cum-Chackmore civil parish)	Aylesbury Vale		
Chalfont Common	3,814	Hamlet (in Chalfont St Peter civil parish)	Chiltern District		
Chalfont Grove		Hamlet (in Chalfont St Giles civil parish)	Chiltern District		
Chalfont St Giles	5,925	Village and civil parish	Chiltern District		Civil parish includes village of Jordans and hamlets of Bottrells Close, Chalfont Grove and Stratton Chase
Chalfont St Peter	12,766	Village and civil parish	Chiltern District		Civil parish includes hamlets of Austenwood, Chalfont Common, Gravel Hill, Layters Green and Horn Hill
Chalkshire		Hamlet (in Ellesborough civil parish)	Wycombe District		
Charndon	862	Hamlet and civil parish	Aylesbury Vale		
Chartridge	1,624	Village and civil parish	Chiltern District		Civil parish includes village of Bellingdon and hamlets of Asheridge, Hundridge, Pednor and Pednor Bottom
Chearsley	539	Village and civil parish	Aylesbury Vale		
Cheddington	1,754	Village and civil parish	Aylesbury Vale		Civil parish includes hamlet of Cooks Wharf
Chelmscote		Village (in Soulbury civil parish)	Aylesbury Vale		
Chenies	246	Village and civil parish	Chiltern District		
Chepping Wycombe	14,455	Civil Parish	Wycombe District		Civil parish includes villages of Flackwell Heath, Loudwater and Tylers Green
Chesham	21,483	Market town and civil parish	Chiltern District		Civil parish includes hamlets of Botley and Lye Green and areas of Asheridge Vale, Chesham Vale, Chessmount, Codmore, Great Hivings, Hilltop, Lowndes, Newtown, Old Town, Pednormead End, Pond Park, Townsend and Waterside
Chesham Bois	3,117	Village and civil parish	Chiltern District		
Chesham Vale		Community within Chesham	Chiltern District		
Chessmount		Estate within Chesham	Chiltern District		
Chetwode	173	Village and civil parish	Aylesbury Vale		
Chicheley	134	Village and civil parish	City of Milton Keynes		
Chilton	302	Village and civil parish	Aylesbury Vale		Civil parish includes hamlet of Easington
Chisbridge Cross		Hamlet (in Great Marlow civil parish)	Chiltern District		
Chivery		Hamlet (in Aston Clinton civil parish)	Aylesbury Vale		
Cholesbury		Village ( in Cholesbury-cum-St Leonards civil parish)	Chiltern District		
Cholesbury-cum-St Leonards	956	Civil parish	Chiltern District		Civil parish includes villages of Cholesbury, Hawridge, St Leonards and hamlet of Buckland Common
Church End		District / neighbourhood (in West Bletchley civil parish).	City of Milton Keynes		Includes the Bletchley Park Museum. Not to be confused with Shenley Church End
Clifton Reynes	178	Village and civil parish	City of Milton Keynes		
Codmore		Hamlet (in Chesham civil parish)	Chiltern District		
Cold Brayfield	75	Village and civil parish	City of Milton Keynes		
Coldharbour		Civil parish	Aylesbury Vale		Civil parish includes village of Fairford Leys
Coldmoorholme		Hamlet (in Little Marlow civil parish)	Wycombe District		Also known as Spade Oak, considered part of Bourne End village
Coleshill	549	Village and civil parish	Chiltern District		Formerly Stoke
Colstrope		Hamlet (in Hambleden civil parish)	Wycombe District		
Cooks Wharf		Hamlet (in Cheddington civil parish)	Aylesbury Vale		
Coombe		Hamlet (in Ellesborough civil parish)	Wycombe District		
Cores End		Hamlet (in Wooburn and Bourne End civil parish)	Wycombe District		
Crafton		Hamlet (in Mentmore civil parish)	Aylesbury Vale		
Creslow	22	Village and civil parish	Aylesbury Vale		
Cressex		District/Suburb of High Wycombe (unparished)	Wycombe District		
Crownfield		Hamlet (in Bledlow-cum-Saunderton civil parish)	Wycombe District		
Cryers Hill		Hamlet (in Hambleden civil parish)	Chiltern District		
Cublington	328	Village and civil parish	Aylesbury Vale		
Cuddington	569	Village and civil parish	Aylesbury Vale		

Note: Population normally available for civil parishes, unavailable for constituent villages and hamlets

== D ==
Settlement	Population	Settlement type	Local authority	Image	Notes
Dadford		Hamlet (in Stowe civil parish)	Aylesbury Vale		
Dagnall	511	Village (in Edlesborough civil parish)	Aylesbury Vale		
Danesfield		Housing estate (in Great Marlow civil parish)	Wycombe District		
Daws Hill		Suburb of High Wycombe	Wycombe District		
Dean		Hamlet (in Wendover civil parish)	Aylesbury Vale		
Denbigh		Group of districts in Bletchley and Fenny Stratford CP	City of Milton Keynes		Includes Denbigh North and thus Stadium MK, and a number of employment districts
Denham	7,139	Village and civil parish	South Bucks District		Most easterly village in Buckinghamshire. Civil parish includes village of Denham, the hamlet of Tatling End and village areas of Denham Green, Denham Garden Village, Higher Denham and New Denham
Denham Garden Village		District in Denham	South Bucks District		
Dinton		Village (in civil parish of Dinton-with-Ford and Upton)	Aylesbury Vale		
Dinton-with-Ford and Upton	809	Civil parish	Aylesbury Vale		Civil parish includes village of Dinton and hamlets of Aston Mullins, Ford, Gibraltar, Upton, Waldridge and Westlington
Ditchfield		Hamlet (in Lane End civil Parish)	Wycombe District		
Dorney	752	Village and civil parish	South Bucks District		Civil parish includes hamlets of Dorney Reach and Lake End
Dorney Reach		Hamlet (in Dorney civil parish)	South Bucks District		
Dorton	166	Village and civil parish	Aylesbury Vale		
Downley	2,244	Village and civil parish	Wycombe District		
Drayton Beauchamp	152	Village and civil parish	Aylesbury Vale		
Drayton Parslow	614	Village and civil parish	Aylesbury Vale		
Dundridge		Hamlet (in Cholesbury-cum-St Leonards civil parish)	Chiltern District		
Dunsmore		Hamlet (in Ellesborough civil parish)	Aylesbury Vale		
Dunton	189	Village and civil parish	Aylesbury Vale		

Note: Population normally available for civil parishes, unavailable for constituent villages and hamlets

== E ==
Settlement	Population	Settlement type	Local authority	Image	Notes
Easington		Hamlet (in Chilton civil parish)	Aylesbury Vale		
East Burnham		District within ( in Burnham civil parish)	South Bucks District		
East Claydon	345	Village and civil parish	Aylesbury Vale		Civil parish includes hamlet of Botolph Claydon
East End		Hamlet (in Weedon civil parish)	Aylesbury Vale		
Edgcott	256	Village and civil parish	Aylesbury Vale		
Edlesborough	2,754	Village and civil parish	Aylesbury Vale		Civil parish includes village of Edlesborough and hamlets of Dagnall, Northall and Ringshall
Egypt		Hamlet (in Farnham Royal civil parish)	South Bucks District		
Ellesborough	811	Village and civil parish	Wycombe District		Civil parish includes hamlets of Butlers Cross, Chalkshire, Coombe, Dunsmore, Nash Lee, North Lee and Terrick
Elm Farm		Modern housing estate in Aylesbury	Aylesbury Vale		
Elmhurst		Neighbourhood in Aylesbury	Aylesbury Vale		
Emberton	720	Village and civil parish	City of Milton Keynes		Civil parish includes village of Emberton and hamlet of Petsoe End
Eythrope		Hamlet (in Waddesdon civil parish)	Aylesbury Vale		

Note: Population normally available for civil parishes, unavailable for constituent villages and hamlets

== F ==
Settlement	Population	Settlement type	Local authority	Image	Notes
Fairford Leys	4,858 (Coldharbour civil parish)	Housing estate in Aylesbury (in Coldharbour civil parish)	Aylesbury Vale		
Far Bletchley		District (in West Bletchley civil parish)	City of Milton Keynes		
Farnham Common		Village (in Farnham Royal civil parish)	South Bucks District		
Farnham Park		Hamlet (in Farnham Royal civil parish)	South Bucks District		
Farnham Royal	5,972	Village and civil parish	South Bucks District		Civil parish includes village of Farnham Common and hamlet of Farnham Park
Fawley	255	Village and civil parish	Wycombe District		Civil parish includes village of Fawley Bottom
Fawley Bottom		Village (in Fawley civil parish)	Wycombe District		
Fenny Stratford		Constituent town of Milton Keynes (in Bletchley and Fenny Stratford civil parish)	City of Milton Keynes		
Fern		Hamlet (in Little Marlow civil parish)	Wycombe District		
Filgrave		Hamlet (in Tyringham and Filgrave civil parish)	City of Milton Keynes		
Fingest		Village (in Hambleden civil parish)	Wycombe District		
Fishermead		District (in Campbell Park (civil parish)	City of Milton Keynes		
Flackwell Heath	5,900	Village (in Chepping Wycombe civil parish)	Wycombe District		(within High Wycombe Urban Area)
Flaunden		Village and civil parish	Dacorum District, Hertfordshire		On the Buckinghamshire / Hertfordshire border
Fleet Marston	47	Village and civil parish	Aylesbury Vale		
Flowers Bottom		Hamlet (in Princes Risborough civil parish)	Wycombe District		
Ford		Hamlet (in Dinton-with-Ford and Upton civil parish)	Aylesbury Vale		
Forty Green, in Bledlow		Hamlet (in Bledlow-cum-Saunderton civil parish)	Wycombe District		
Forty Green, in Marlow		Undeveloped agricultural area (in Marlow civil parish)	Wycombe District		
Forty Green, in Penn		Hamlet (in Penn civil parish)	Chiltern District		
Foscot (also called Foscote and Foxcote)	31	Hamlet and civil parish	Aylesbury Vale		
Four Ashes		Hamlet (in Hughenden civil parish)	Wycombe District		
Frieth		Village (in Hambleden civil parish)	Chiltern District		
Frith-hill		Hamlet (in Great Missenden civil parish)	Chiltern District		
Fulbrook		Hamlet (in Hogshaw civil parish)	Aylesbury Vale		
Fulmer	485	Village and civil parish	South Bucks District		

Note: Population normally available for civil parishes, unavailable for constituent villages and hamlets

== G ==
Settlement	Population	Settlement type	Local authority	Image	Notes
Gawcott	778	Village (in Gawcott with Lenborough civil parish)	Aylesbury Vale		
Gawcott with Lenborough		Civil parish	Aylesbury Vale		Civil parish includes village of Gawcott and hamlet of Lenborough
Gayhurst	128	Village and civil parish	City of Milton Keynes		
George Green		Hamlet (in Wexham civil parish)	South Bucks District		
Gerrards Cross	8,017	Town and civil parish	South Bucks District		
Gibraltar		Hamlet (in Dinton-with-Ford and Upton civil parish)	Aylesbury Vale		
Granborough	545	Village and civil parish	Aylesbury Vale		Civil parish includes hamlet of Green End
Gravel Hill		Hamlet (in Chalfont St Peter civil parish)	Chiltern District		
Great and Little Hampden	259	Civil parish	Wycombe District		Civil parish includes villages of Great Hampden and Little Hampden and hamlets of Green Hailey and Hampden Row
Great and Little Kimble cum Marsh	960	Civil parish	Wycombe District		Civil parish includes villages of Great Kimble and Little Kimble and hamlets of Kimble Wick, Marsh and Smoky Row
Great Brickhill	817	Village and civil parish	Aylesbury Vale		
Great Crawley		Part of village of North Crawley	City of Milton Keynes		
Great Hampden		Village (in Great and Little Hampden civil parish)	Wycombe District		
Great Hivings		Neighbourhood within Chesham	Chiltern District		
Great Horwood	1,049	Village and civil parish	Aylesbury Vale		Civil parish includes hamlet of Singleborough
Great Kimble		Village (in Great and Little Kimble civil parish)	Wycombe District		
Great Kingshill		Village (in Hughenden civil parish)	Wycombe District		(within High Wycombe Urban Area)
Great Linford	19,350	Village, district and civil parish	City of Milton Keynes		Civil parish includes districts of Blakelands, Bolbeck Park, Conniburrow, Downhead Park, Downs Barn, Giffard Park, Neath Hill, Pennyland, Tongwell and Willen Park
Great Marlow	1,321	Civil parish	Wycombe District		Civil parish includes hamlets of Bovingdon Green, Burroughs Grove, Chisbridge Cross and Danesfield
Great Missenden	10,138	Village and civil parish	Chiltern District		Civil parish includes village of Prestwood and hamlets of Ballinger, Ballinger Bottom, Ballinger Common, Bryant's Bottom, Frith-hill, Heath End, Hotley Bottom, Hyde End, Little Wood Corner, Mobwell and South Heath
Great Woolstone		Village (in Campbell Park (civil parish)	City of Milton Keynes		
Greatgap		Hamlet (in Ivinghoe civil parish)	Aylesbury Vale		
Green End		Hamlet (in Granborough civil parish)	Aylesbury Vale		
Green Hailey		Hamlet in (Great and Little Hampden civil parish)	Wycombe District		
Green Street		Suburb of High Wycombe	Wycombe District		
Grendon Underwood	1,625	Village and civil parish	Aylesbury Vale		
Grove		Village (in Slapton civil parish)	Aylesbury Vale		

Note: Population normally available for civil parishes, unavailable for constituent villages and hamlets

== H ==
Settlement	Population	Settlement type	Local authority	Image	Notes
Haddenham	4,502	Village and civil parish	Aylesbury Vale		
Halton	935	Village and civil parish	Aylesbury Vale		Civil parish / village includes district of South End
Hambleden	1,413	Village and civil parish	Wycombe District		Civil parish includes the villages of Fingest and Frieth, and the hamlets of Colstrope, Mill End, Parmoor, Pheasant's Hill and Skirmett
Hampden Row		Hamlet (in Great and Little Hampden civil parish)	Wycombe District		
Handy Cross		Hamlet (in Little Marlow civil parish)	Wycombe District		
Hanslope	2,238	Village and civil parish	City of Milton Keynes		
Hardmead	70	Village and civil parish	City of Milton Keynes		
Hardwick	315	Village and civil parish	Aylesbury Vale		
Hartwell		Village (in Stone with Bishopstone and Hartwell civil parish)	Aylesbury Vale		
Haversham		Village (in Haversham-cum-Little Linford civil parish)	City of Milton Keynes		
Haversham-cum-Little Linford	873	Civil parish	City of Milton Keynes		Civil parish includes villages of Haversham and Little Linford
Hawks Hill		Hamlet (in Wooburn and Bourne End civil parish	Wycombe District		
Hawridge		Village (in Cholesbury-cum-St Leonards civil parish)	Chiltern District		
Haydon Hill		Housing estate (in Aylesbury civil parish)	Aylesbury Vale		
Hazlemere	9,350	Village and suburb of High Wycombe and civil parish	Wycombe District		(within High Wycombe Urban Area)
Heath End		Hamlet (in Great Missenden civil parish)	Chiltern District		
Hedgerley	873	Village and civil parish	South Bucks District		Civil parish includes hamlets of Hedgerley Dean, Hedgerley Green and Hedgerley Hill
Hedgerley Dean		Hamlet (in Hedgerley civil parish)	South Bucks District		
Hedgerley Green		Hamlet (in Hedgerley civil parish)	South Bucks District		
Hedgerley Hill		Hamlet (in Hedgerley civil parish)	South Bucks District		
Hedsor	95	Village and civil parish	Wycombe District		Civil parish includes hamlet of Widmoor
Heelands		District (in Bradwell civil parish)	City of Milton Keynes		
High Wycombe	120,256	Large town, in an unparished area	Wycombe District		(within High Wycombe Urban Area)
High Wycombe Urban Area	133,034	Conurbation	Wycombe District		Includes Bourne End/Flackwell Heath, Cookham(Berkshire), Great Kingshill, Hazlemere/Tylers Green, High Wycombe, Walters Ash and Hughenden Valley
Higher Denham		Locality (in Denham civil parish)	South Bucks District		
Hillesden	216	Village and civil parish	Aylesbury Vale		
Hilltop		Residential area (in Chesham civil parish)	Chiltern District		
Hitcham		Village (in Burnham civil parish)	South Bucks District		
Hoggeston	104	Village and civil parish	Aylesbury Vale		
Hogshaw	75	Village and civil parish	Aylesbury Vale		Civil parish includes ancient village of Fulbrook
Hollingdon		Hamlet (in Soulbury civil parish)	Aylesbury Vale		
Holly Green		Hamlet (in Bledlow-cum-Saunderton civil parish)	Wycombe District		
Hollybush Hill		Hamlet (in Stoke Poges civil parish)	South Bucks		
Holmer Green	4,077	Village (in Little Missenden civil parish)	Chiltern District		
Holmers Farm		Suburb of High Wycombe	Wycombe District		
Honeyburge		Hamlet (in Boarstall civil parish)	Aylesbury Vale		
Horn Hill		Hamlet (in Chalfont St Peter civil parish)	Chiltern District		
Horsenden		Hamlet (in Longwick-cum-Ilmer civil parish)	Wycombe District		
Horsleys Green		Hamlet (in Stokenchurch civil parish)	Wycombe District		
Horton		Hamlet (in Ivinghoe civil parish)	Aylesbury Vale		
Horton Wharf		Hamlet (in Slapton civil parish)	Aylesbury Vale		
Hotley Bottom		Hamlet (in Chalfont St Peter civil parish)	Chiltern District		
Hughenden		Village (in Hughenden Valley civil parish)	Wycombe District		
Hughenden Valley	8,506	Village and civil parish	Wycombe District		Civil parish includes village of Hughenden and hamlets of Cryers Hill, Four Ashes, Great Kingshill, Naphill, Walters Ash and Widmer End. Civil parish within High Wycombe Urban Area
Hulcott	108	Village and civil parish	Aylesbury Vale		
Hundridge		Hamlet (in Chartridge civil parish)	Chiltern District		
Hunt's Green		Hamlet (in The Lee civil parish)	Chiltern District		
Hunt's Hill		Hamlet (in Hughenden Valley civil parish)	Wycombe District		
Hyde End		Hamlet (in Great Missenden civil parish)	Chiltern District		
Hyde Heath		Village (in Little Missenden civil parish)	Chiltern District		

Note: Population normally available for civil parishes, unavailable for constituent villages and hamlets

== I ==
Settlement	Population	Settlement type	Local authority	Image	Notes
Ibstone	237	Village and civil parish	Wycombe District		
Ickford	680	Village and civil parish	Aylesbury Vale		
Ilmer		Village (in Longwick-cum-Ilmer civil parish)	Wycombe District		
Iver	11,119	Village and civil parish	South Bucks District		Civil Parish includes villages of Iver and Iver Heath, hamlet of Shreding Green and residential areas of Love Green, Richings Park and Thorney
Iver Heath		Village (in Iver civil parish)	South Bucks District		
Ivinghoe	965	Village and civil parish	Aylesbury Vale		Civil parish includes hamlets of Greatgap, Horton, Ivinghoe Aston and Ringshall
Ivinghoe Aston		Hamlet (in Ivinghoe civil parish)	Aylesbury Vale		

Note: Population normally available for civil parishes, unavailable for constituent villages and hamlets

== J ==
Settlement	Population	Settlement type	Local authority	Image	Notes
Jordans	c. 700	Village (in Chalfont St Giles civil parish)	Chiltern District		

== K ==
Settlement	Population	Settlement type	Local authority	Image	Notes
Kents Hill		District in Milton Keynes (in Kents Hill and Monkston civil parish)	City of Milton Keynes		
Kents Hill and Monkston	8,344	Civil parish	City of Milton Keynes		Civil parish includes Brinklow, Kents Hill and Monkston
Kimble Wick		Hamlet (in Great and Little Kimble civil parish)	Wycombe District		
Kings Ash (or Kingsash)		Hamlet (in Wendover civil parish)	Wycombe District		
Kingsey	207	Village and civil parish	Aylesbury Vale		
Kingswood	149	Hamlet and civil parish	Aylesbury Vale		Civil parish includes the hamlet of Tetchwick
Knotty Green		Hamlet (in Penn civil parish)	Chiltern District		

Note: Population normally available for civil parishes, unavailable for constituent villages and hamlets

== L ==
Settlement	Population	Settlement type	Local authority	Image	Notes
Lacey Green	2,413	Village and civil parish	Wycombe District		Civil parish includes hamlets of Parslow's Hillock and Wardrobes
Lake End		Hamlet ( in Dorney civil parish)	South Bucks District		
Lamport (occasionally called Langport)		Hamlet (in Stowe civil parish)	Aylesbury Vale		
Lane End	3,563	Village and civil parish	Wycombe District		Civil parish includes hamlets of Cadmore End, Ditchfield, Moor Common and Moor End
Lathbury	156	Village and civil parish	City of Milton Keynes		
Latimer		Village (in Latimer and Ley Hill civil parish)	Chiltern District		
Latimer and Ley Hill	977	Civil parish	Chiltern District		Civil parish includes villages of Latimer and Ley Hill and hamlets of Orchard Leigh and Tyler's Hill
Lavendon	1,303	Village and civil parish	City of Milton Keynes		
Layters Green		Hamlet (in Chalfont St Peter civil parish)	Chiltern District		
Leckhampstead	192	Village and civil parish	Aylesbury Vale		
Ledborough		Former hamlet (in Beaconsfield civil parish)	South Bucks District		
Ledburn		Hamlet (in Mentmore civil parish)	Aylesbury Vale		
Lee Clump		Hamlet (in The Lee civil parish)	Chiltern District		
Lee Common		Hamlet (in The Lee civil parish)	Chiltern District		
Lee Gate		Hamlet (in The Lee civil parish)	Chiltern District		
Lenborough		Hamlet (in Buckingham civil parish)	Aylesbury Vale		
Lent Rise		Hamlet (in Burnham civil parish)	South Bucks District		
Ley Hill		Village (in Latimer and Ley Hill civil parish)	Chiltern District		
Lillingstone Dayrell		Village (in Lillingstone Dayrell with Luffield Abbey civil parish)	Aylesbury Vale		
Lillingstone Dayrell with Luffield Abbey	103	Civil parish	Aylesbury Vale		Civil parish includes village of Lillingstone Dayrell and location of Luffield Abbey
Lillingstone Lovell	129	Village and civil parish	Aylesbury Vale		
Linslade		Town (in Leighton-Linslade Bedfordshire)	Central Bedfordshire		Linslade was transferred from Buckinghamshire in 1965
Little Brickhill	407	Village and civil parish	City of Milton Keynes		
Little Chalfont	6,013	Village and civil parish	Chiltern District		
Littlecote (also known as Lidcote)		Former village	Aylesbury Vale		
Little Crawley		Part of village (in North Crawley civil parish)	City of Milton Keynes		
Little Hampden		Village (in Great and Little Hampden civil parish)	Wycombe District		
Little Horwood	434	Village and civil parish	Aylesbury Vale		
Little Linford		Village (in Haversham-cum-Little Linford civil parish)	City of Milton Keynes		
Little London, near Brill		Hamlet (in Brill civil parish)	Aylesbury Vale		
Little London, near Oakley		Hamlet (in Oakley civil parish)	Aylesbury Vale		
Little London, near Wendover		Hamlet (in Wendover civil parish)	Aylesbury Vale		
Little Marlow	1,331	Village and civil parish	Wycombe District		Civil parish includes hamlets of Coldmoorholme, Fern, Handy Cross, Sheepridge, and Winchbottom, also part of village of Bourne End
Little Marsh		Hamlet (in Marsh Gibbon civil parish)	Aylesbury Vale		
Little Meadle		Hamlet (in Longwick-cum-Ilmer civil parish)	Wycombe District		
Little Missenden	2,234	Village and civil parish	Chiltern District		Civil parish includes village of Holmer Green and hamlets of Beamond End, Brays Green, Hyde Heath, Little Kingshill, Mop End and Spurlands End
Little Wood Corner		Hamlet (in Great Missenden civil parish)	Chiltern District		
Little Woolstone		Village (in Campbell Park (civil parish))	City of Milton Keynes		
Littleworth, Wing,		Hamlet (in Wing civil parish)	Aylesbury Vale		
Littleworth, Burnham		Hamlet (in Burnham civil parish)	South Bucks District		
Littleworth Common		Hamlet (in Burnham civil parish)	South Bucks District		
Long Crendon	2,451	Village and civil parish	Aylesbury Vale		
Long Street		Hamlet (in Hanslope civil parish)	City of Milton Keynes		
Longwick		Hamlet (in Longwick-cum-Ilmer civil parish)	Wycombe District		
Longwick-cum-Ilmer	1,267	Civil parish	Wycombe District		Civil parish includes village of Ilmer and hamlets of Horsenden, Longwick, Owlswick and Meadle
Loosley Row		Hamlet (in Princes Risborough civil parish)	Wycombe District		
Loudwater	4,170	Hamlet (in Chepping Wycombe civil parish)	Wycombe District		
Loughton	6,363	Village, modern district of Milton Keynes and civil parish	City of Milton Keynes		Civil parish includes district of Great Holm, Loughton Lodge and Knowlhill
Loundes		Residential area (in Chesham civil parish)	Chiltern District		
Love Green		Hamlet (in Iver civil parish)	South Bucks District		
Lower Bacombe		Hamlet (in Wendover civil parish)	Aylesbury Vale		
Lower Cadsden		Hamlet (in Princes Risborough civil parish)	Aylesbury Vale		Part of hamlet of Cadsden
Lower Hartwell		Hamlet (in Stone with Bishopstone and Hartwell civil parish)	Aylesbury Vale		
Lower North Dean		Hamlet (in Princes Risborough civil parish)	Aylesbury Vale		Part of hamlet of North Dean
Lower Pollicott		Hamlet (in Ashendon civil parish)	Aylesbury Vale		
Lower Weald		Hamlet (in Calverton civil parish)	City of Milton Keynes		
Lower Winchendon		Alternative name for Nether Winchendon	Aylesbury Vale		
Lower Woodend		Hamlet (in Medmenham civil parish)	Wycombe District		
Ludgershall	409	Village and civil parish	Aylesbury Vale		
Luffield Abbey		Location (in Lillingstone Dayrell with Luffield Abbey civil parish)	Aylesbury Vale		
Lye Green		Hamlet (in Chesham civil parish)	Chiltern District		

Note: Population normally available for civil parishes, unavailable for constituent villages and hamlets

== M ==
Settlement	Population	Settlement type	Local authority	Image	Notes
Maids Moreton	847	Village and civil parish	Aylesbury Vale		
Mantles Green		District (in Little Missenden civil parish)	Chiltern District		
Marlow	14,004	Town and civil parish	Wycombe District		Civil parish includes hamlet of Forty Green
Marlow Bottom	3,295	Large village and civil parish	Wycombe District		
Marlow Common		Hamlet (in Great Marlow civil parish)	Wycombe District		
Marsh		Hamlet (in Great and Little Kimble civil parish)	Wycombe District		
Marsh Gibbon	969	Village and civil parish	Aylesbury Vale		Civil parish includes hamlets of Little Marsh and Summerstown
Marsworth	741	Village and civil parish	Aylesbury Vale		Civil parish includes hamlet of Startop's End
Meadle		Hamlet (in Longwick-cum-Ilmer civil parish)	Wycombe District		
Medmenham	960	Village and civil parish	Wycombe District		Civil parish includes hamlets of Bockmer End, Lower Woodend and Rockwell End
Mentmore	385	Village and civil parish	Aylesbury Vale		Civil parish includes hamlets of Crafton and Ledburn
Micklefield		District in High Wycombe (unparished)	Wycombe District		
Middle Claydon	146	Village and civil parish	Aylesbury Vale		Civil parish includes hamlet of Verney Junction
Middle Weald		Hamlet (in Calverton civil parish)	City of Milton Keynes		
Middlegreen		Hamlet (in Wexham civil parish)	South Bucks		
Middleton	5,624	District in Milton Keynes CP	City of Milton Keynes		Includes the original Milton Keynes Village
Mill End		Hamlet (in Hambleden civil parish)	Wycombe District		
Milton Keynes (civil parish)	5,624	Civil parish	City of Milton Keynes		includes Middleton and Oakgrove. As of 2023, a joint parish with Broughton. Not to be confused with Central Milton Keynes.
Milton Keynes	229,941	City	City of Milton Keynes		The boundary of Milton Keynes has no statutory definition. The figure here is for the Milton Keynes "built-up area" as defined by the Office for National Statistics. It consists of four "built-up sub-areas": "Bletchley" (actually Bletchley and Fenny Stratford and West Bletchley), "Newport Pagnell" (that part of the urban area that lies east of the M1), "Woburn Sands" (actually Woburn Sands and Aspley Guise) and "Milton Keynes" (the remainder of the built-up area, an area significantly smaller than that of the 1967 designated area.
Mobwell		Hamlet (in Great Missenden civil parish)	Chiltern District		
Monks Risborough		Village (in Princes Risborough civil parish)	Wycombe District		Civil parish includes hamlets of Askett, Cadsden, Meadle, Owlswick and Whiteleaf
Monkston		Residential district (in Kents Hill and Monkston civil parish)	City of Milton Keynes		
Moor Common		Hamlet (in Lane End civil parish)	Wycombe District		
Moor End		Hamlet (in Lane End civil parish)	Wycombe District		
Mop End		Hamlet (in Little Missenden civil parish)	Chiltern District		
Moulsoe	318	Village and civil parish	City of Milton Keynes		
Mount Pleasant		Suburb of Buckingham	Aylesbury Vale		
Mursley	611	Village and civil parish	Aylesbury Vale		

Note: Population normally available for civil parishes, unavailable for constituent villages and hamlets

== N ==
Settlement	Population	Settlement type	Local authority	Image	Notes
Naphill		Village (in Hughenden Valley civil parish)	Wycombe District		
Naphill Common		Site of Special Scientific Interest	Wycombe District		
Nash	417	Village and civil parish	Aylesbury Vale		
Nash Lee		Hamlet (in Ellesborough civil parish)	Chiltern District		
Nearton End		Hamlet (in Swanbourne civil parish)	Aylesbury Vale		
Nether Winchendon (or Lower Winchendon)	165	Village and civil parish	Aylesbury Vale		
New Bradwell	3,109	Village and civil parish	City of Milton Keynes		
New Denham		Area of Village (Denham)	South Bucks		
New Zealand		Hamlet (in Aylesbury civil parish)	Aylesbury Vale		
Newport Pagnell	15,118	Town and civil parish	City of Milton Keynes		Part of Milton Keynes urban area
Newton Blossomville	329	Village and civil parish	City of Milton Keynes		
Newton Leys		District of Bletchley and Fenny Stratford CP	City of Milton Keynes		
Newton Longville	1,846	Village and civil parish	Aylesbury Vale		
Newtown		Housing development (in Chesham)	Chiltern District		
North Crawley	736	Village and civil parish	City of Milton Keynes		
North Dean		Hamlet (in Princes Risborough civil parish)	Aylesbury Vale		Comprising Lower North Dean and Upper North Dean
North End		Hamlet (in Stewkley civil parish)	Aylesbury Vale		
North Lee		Hamlet (in Ellesborough civil parish)	Wycombe District		
North Marston	781	Village and civil parish	Aylesbury Vale		
Northall		Hamlet (in Edlesborough civil parish)	Aylesbury Vale		
Northend		Village (in Turville and Watlington civil parishes)	Wycombe District		Straddles Buckinghamshire and Oxfordshire border
Nup End		Hamlet (in Wingrave civil parish)	Aylesbury Vale		

Note: Population normally available for civil parishes, unavailable for constituent villages and hamlets

== O ==
Settlement	Population	Settlement type	Local authority	Image	Notes
Oakgrove		District (in Milton Keynes civil parish)	City of Milton Keynes		
Oakley	1,007	Village and civil parish	Aylesbury Vale		Civil parish includes hamlets of Addingrove, Little London and The Foresters
Old Bletchley		District (in West Bletchley civil parish)	City of Milton Keynes		
Old Woughton		Civil parish	City of Milton Keynes		Old Woughton was formed after Woughton-on-the-Green was split into Old Woughton and Woughton. Population figure is awaited.
Olney	6,477	Market town and civil parish	City of Milton Keynes		
Oldbrook		District (in Campbell Park civil parish)	City of Milton Keynes		
Orchard Leigh		Hamlet (in Latimer civil parish)	Chiltern District		
Oving	478	Village and civil parish	Aylesbury Vale		

Note: Population data unavailable for hamlets

== P ==
Settlement	Population	Settlement type	Local authority	Image	Notes
Padbury	810	Village and civil parish	Aylesbury Vale		
Page Hill		Suburb of Buckingham	Aylesbury Vale		
Parmoor		Hamlet (in Hambleden civil parish)	Wycombe District		
Parslow's Hillock		Hamlet (in Lacey Green civil parish)	Wycombe District		
Pednor		Hamlet (in Chartridge civil parish)	Chiltern District		
Pednor Bottom		Valley (in Chartridge civil parish)	Chiltern District		
Pednormead End		Area in Chesham	Chiltern District		
Penn	3,961	Village and civil parish	Chiltern District		Includes hamlets of Beacon Hill, Forty Green, Knotty Green, Penn Street and Winchmore Hill and area of Penn Bottom
Penn Bottom		Area of Penn	Chiltern District		
Penn Street		Hamlet (in Penn civil parish)	Chiltern District		
Petsoe End		Hamlet (in Emberton civil parish)	City of Milton Keynes		
Pheasant's Hill		Hamlet (in Hambleden civil parish)	Wycombe District		
Piddington		Hamlet (in Piddington and Wheeler End civil parish)	Wycombe District		
Piddington and Wheeler End	651	Civil parish	Wycombe District		Includes hamlets of Piddington and Wheeler End
Pitchcott	44	Village and civil parish	Aylesbury Vale		
Pitstone	2,952	Village and civil parish	Aylesbury Vale		Civil parish includes hamlet of Barley End and areas of Pitstone Green and Pitstone Hill
Pitstone Green		Area within Pitstone	Aylesbury Vale		
Pitstone Hill		Site of Special Scientific Importance within Pitstone civil parish	Aylesbury Vale		
Pond Park		Area within Chesham	Chiltern District		
Poundon	114	Hamlet and civil parish	Aylesbury Vale		
Prebendal Farm		Housing estate in Aylesbury	Aylesbury Vale		
Preston Bissett	282	Village and civil parish	Aylesbury Vale		
Prestwood		Village (in Great Missenden civil parish)	Chiltern District		
Princes Risborough	8,101	Small town and civil parish	Wycombe District		Civil parish includes hamlets of Alscot, Askett, Cadsden (comprising Lower Cadsden and Upper Cadsden), Flowers Bottom, Loosley Row, Lower North Dean, North Dean, Redland End, Speen, and Upper North Dean

Note: Population normally available for civil parishes, unavailable for constituent villages and hamlets

== Q ==
Settlement	Population	Settlement type	Local authority	Image	Notes
Quainton	1,292	Village and civil parish	Aylesbury Vale		Civil parish includes hamlet of Shipton Lee
Quarrendon (estate)	5,478	Large housing estate in Aylesbury within Aylesbury civil parish	Aylesbury Vale		
Quarrendon (village)	44	Civil parish	Aylesbury Vale		Deserted medieval village
Queens Park		Area of Aylesbury within Aylesbury civil parish	Aylesbury Vale		

Note: Population normally available for civil parishes, unavailable for constituent villages and hamlets

== R ==
Settlement	Population	Settlement type	Local authority	Image	Notes
Radclive		Village (in Radclive-cum-Chackmore civil parish)	Aylesbury Vale		
Radclive-cum-Chackmore	236	Civil parish	Aylesbury Vale		Civil parish includes the village of Radclive and hamlet of Chackmore
Radnage	673	Village and civil parish	Wycombe District		Civil parish includes hamlets of Bennett End, The City and Town End
Ravenstone	209	Village and civil parish	City of Milton Keynes		
Redland End		Hamlet (in Princes Risborough and civil parish)	Wycombe District		
Richings Park		Residential neighbourhood (in Iver civil parish)	South Bucks District		
Ringshall		Hamlet (across Edlesborough and Ivinghoe and Little Gaddesden, Hertfordshire civil parishes)	Aylesbury Vale / Dacorum (Hertfordshire)		
Rockwell End		Hamlet (in Medmenham civil parish)	Wycombe District		
Rooksley		District (in Bradwell civil parish)	City of Milton Keynes		
Rose Hill		Hamlet (in Burnham civil parish)	South Bucks District		
Rout's Green		Hamlet (in Bledlow-cum-Saunderton civil parish)	Wycombe District		
Rowsham		Hamlet (in Wingrave civil parish)	Aylesbury Vale		

Note: Population normally available for civil parishes, unavailable for constituent villages and hamlets

== S ==
Settlement	Population	Settlement type	Local authority	Image	Notes
Sands		Suburb of High Wycombe	Wycombe District		
Saunderton		Village (in Bledlow-cum-Saunderton civil parish)	Wycombe District		
Saunderton Lee		Hamlet (in Bledlow-cum-Saunderton civil parish)	Wycombe District		
Sedrup		Hamlet (in Stone with Bishopstone and Hartwell civil parish)	Aylesbury Vale		
Seer Green	2,311	Village and civil parish	Chiltern District		
Shabbington	486	Village and civil parish	Aylesbury Vale		
Shalstone	117	Village and civil parish	Aylesbury Vale		
Sheepridge		Hamlet (in Little Marlow civil parish)	Wycombe District		
Shenley Brook End	25,828	Village and civil parish	City of Milton Keynes		
Shenley Church End	12,961	Village, district and civil parish	City of Milton Keynes		
Sherington	486	Village and civil parish	City of Milton Keynes		
Shipton		Hamlet (in Winslow civil parish)	Aylesbury Vale		
Shipton Brook		Hamlet (in Winslow civil parish)	Aylesbury Vale		
Shipton Lee		Hamlet (in Quainton civil parish)	Aylesbury Vale		
Shredding Green		Hamlet (in Iver civil parish)	South Bucks District		
Simpson		Village (in Simpson and Ashland civil parish)	City of Milton Keynes		
Simpson and Ashland	1,142	Civil parish	City of Milton Keynes		Civil parish includes village of Simpson and districts of Ashland and West Ashland
Singleborough		Hamlet (in Great Horwood civil parish)	Aylesbury Vale		
Skirmett		Hamlet (in Hambleden civil parish)	Wycombe District		
Skittle Green		Hamlet (in Bledlow-cum-Saunderton civil parish)	Wycombe District		
Slapton	529	Village and civil parish	Aylesbury Vale		Includes village of Grove and hamlet of Horton Wharf
Smalldean		Hamlet (in Wendover civil parish)	Aylesbury Vale		
Smoky Row		Hamlet (in Great and Little Kimble civil parish)	Wycombe District		
Soulbury	736	Village and civil parish	Aylesbury Vale		Civil parish includes hamlets of Bragenham, Chelmscote, Hollingdon and Stockgrove
Southcourt	6,912 (Southcourt ward)	Housing estate in Aylesbury (in Aylesbury civil parish)	Aylesbury Vale		
South End		Area in Haddenham (in Haddenham civil parish)	Aylesbury Vale		
Southend		Hamlet (in Turville civil parish)	Wycombe District		
Speen		Village (in Princes Risborough civil parish)	Wycombe District		
Springfield		District (in Campbell Park (civil parish)	City of Milton Keynes		
Spurlands End		Hamlet (in Little Missenden civil parish)	Chiltern District		
St Leonards		Village (in Cholesbury-cum-St Leonards civil parish)	Chiltern District		
Stantonbury	10,084	District and civil parish (in Milton Keynes)	City of Milton Keynes		
Startop's End		Hamlet (in Marsworth civil parish)	Aylesbury Vale		
Steeple Claydon	2,278	Village and civil parish	Aylesbury Vale		
Stewkley	1,840	Village and civil parish	Aylesbury Vale		Civil parish includes hamlets of North End and Stewkley Dean
Stewkley Dean		Hamlet (in Stewkley civil parish)	Aylesbury Vale		
Stockgrove		Hamlet (in Soulbury civil parish)	Aylesbury Vale		
Stoke Goldington	575	Village and civil parish	City of Milton Keynes		
Stoke Green		Hamlet (in Stoke Poges civil parish	South Bucks District		
Stoke Hammond	875	Village and civil parish	Aylesbury Vale		Only Thankful Village in Buckinghamshire
Stoke Mandeville	5,825	Village and civil parish	Aylesbury Vale		
Stoke Poges	4,752	Village and civil parish	South Bucks District		Civil parish includes hamlets of Hollybush Hill and Stoke Green
Stokenchurch	4,801	Village and civil parish	Wycombe District		Civil parish includes hamlets of Beacon's Bottom, Bolter End, Horsleys Green, Studley Green and Waterend
Stone		Village (in Stone with Bishopstone and Hartwell civil parish)	Aylesbury Vale		
Stone with Bishopstone and Hartwell	2,587	Civil parish	Aylesbury Vale		Civil parish includes villages of Bishopstone, Hartwell and Stone and hamlets of Lower Hartwell and Sedrup
Stony Stratford	7,735	Town and civil parish	City of Milton Keynes		
Stowe	886	Civil parish and former village	Aylesbury Vale		Civil parish includes hamlets of Boycott, Dadford and Lamport
Stratton Chase		Hamlet (in Chalfont St Giles civil parish)	Chiltern District		
Studley Green		Hamlet (in Stokenchurch civil parish)	Wycombe District		
Summerstown		Hamlet (in Marsh Gibbon civil parish)	Aylesbury Vale		
Swan Bottom		Hamlet (in The Lee civil parish	Chiltern District		
Swanbourne	437	Village and civil parish	Aylesbury Vale		Civil parish includes hamlet of Nearton End

Note: Population normally available for civil parishes, unavailable for constituent villages and hamlets

== T ==
Settlement	Population	Settlement type	Local authority	Image	Notes
Taplow	1,669	Village and civil parish	South Bucks District		
Tathall End		Hamlet (in Hanslope civil parish)	City of Milton Keynes		
Tatling End		Area in Denham village and Denham civil parish	South Bucks		
Tattenhoe		District in Shenley Brook End civil parish	City of Milton Keynes		
Terrick		Hamlet (in Ellesborough civil parish)	Wycombe District		
Terriers		Suburb of High Wycombe	Wycombe District		
Tetchwick		Hamlet (in Kingswood civil parish)	Aylesbury Vale		
The City		Hamlet (in Radnage civil parish)	Wycombe District		
The Hale		Hamlet (in Wendover civil parish)	Aylesbury Vale		
The Lee	698	Village and civil parish	Chiltern District		Civil parish includes hamlets of Hunt's Green, Lee Clump, Lee Common, Lee Gate, Potter Row and Swan Bottom
Thornborough	641	Village and civil parish	Aylesbury Vale		
Thorney		Hamlet (in Iver civil parish)	South Bucks District		
Thornton	194	Village and civil parish	Aylesbury Vale		
Tingewick	1,093	Village and civil parish	Aylesbury Vale		
Tongwell		District and ancient hamlet (in Great Linford civil parish)	City of Milton Keynes		
Totteridge		Suburb of High Wycombe	Wycombe District		
Town End		Hamlet (in Radnage civil parish)	Wycombe District		
Townsend		Extension to Chesham town	Chiltern District		
Turnfurlong (also Turn Furlong)		Area of Aylesbury	Aylesbury Vale		
Turville	340	Village and civil parish	Wycombe District		Civil parish includes hamlets of Northend, Southend and Turville Heath
Turville Heath		Area in Turville civil parish	Wycombe District		
Turweston	211	Village and civil parish	Aylesbury Vale		Most westerly village in Buckinghamshire
Twyford	566	Village and civil parish	Aylesbury Vale		
Tylers Green		Village (in Chepping Wycombe civil parish)	Wycombe District		(within High Wycombe Urban Area)
Tyler's Hill		Hamlet (in Latimer civil parish)	Chiltern District		
Tyringham	250	Village (in Tyringham and Filgrave civil parish)	City of Milton Keynes		
Tyringham and Filgrave	250	Civil parish	City of Milton Keynes		Civil parish includes villages of Filgrave and Tyringham

Note: Population normally available for civil parishes, unavailable for constituent villages and hamlets

== U ==
Settlement	Population	Settlement type	Local authority	Image	Notes
Upper Bacombe		Hamlet (in Wendover civil parish)	Aylesbury Vale		
Upper Cadsden		Hamlet (in Princes Risborough civil parish)	Wycombe District		Part of hamlet of Cadsden
Upper Pollicott		Hamlet (in Ashendon civil parish)	Aylesbury Vale		
Upper Weald		Hamlet (in Calverton civil parish)	City of Milton Keynes		
Upper Winchendon (also Over Winchendon)	87	Village and civil parish	Aylesbury Vale		
Upton		Hamlet (in Dinton-with-Ford and Upton civil parish)	Aylesbury Vale		

Note: Population normally available for civil parishes, unavailable for constituent villages and hamlets

== V ==
Settlement	Population	Settlement type	Local authority	Image	Notes
Vaches		Hamlet (in Aston Clinton civil parish)	Aylesbury Vale		
Verney Junction		Hamlet (in Middle Claydon civil parish)	Aylesbury Vale		

Note: Population normally available for civil parishes, unavailable for constituent villages and hamlets

== W ==
Settlement	Population	Settlement type	Local authority	Image	Notes
Waddesdon	2,097	Village and civil parish	Aylesbury Vale		Civil parish includes hamlets of Eythrope and Wormstone
Waldridge		Ancient village (in Dinton-with-Ford and Upton civil parish)	Aylesbury Vale		
Walters Ash (sometimes Walter's Ash)		Village (in Bradenham civil parish)	Wycombe District		(within High Wycombe Urban Area)
Walton in Aylesbury		Hamlet (in Aylesbury civil parish)	Aylesbury Vale		
Walton in Milton Keynes	11,923	District in Milton Keynes and civil parish	City of Milton Keynes		
Walton Court	5,961	Estate in Aylesbury (in Aylesbury civil parish)	Aylesbury Vale		
Wardrobes		Hamlet (in Lacey Green civil parish)	Wycombe District		
Warrington	32	Hamlet and civil parish	City of Milton Keynes		Most northerly hamlet/civil parish in Buckinghamshire
Water Eaton		Area of Milton Keynes (in Bletchley and Fenny Stratford civil parish)	City of Milton Keynes		
Water Stratford	112	Village and civil parish	Aylesbury Vale		
Waterend		Hamlet (in Stokenchurch civil parish)	Wycombe District		
Watermead	2,343	Housing estate in Aylesbury and civil parish	Aylesbury Vale		
Waterside		Hamlet (in Chesham civil parish)	Chiltern District		
Wavendon	787	Village and civil parish	City of Milton Keynes		
Weedon	275	Village and civil parish	Aylesbury Vale		Civil parish includes hamlet of East End
Weedon Hill		Suburban residential neighbourhood in Aylesbury (in Buckingham Park civil parish)	Aylesbury Vale		Old name (along with Berryfields) of Buckingham Park
Well End	530	Hamlet (in Little Marlow civil parish)	Wycombe District		
Wendover	7,399	Market town and civil parish	Aylesbury Vale		Includes hamlets of Dean, Kings Ash, Little London (Wendover), Lower Bacombe, Smalldean, The Hale, Upper Bacombe, Wendover Dean and World's End
Wendover Dean		Hamlet (in Wendover civil parish)	Aylesbury Vale		
West Ashland		District (in Simpson and Ashland civil parish)	City of Milton Keynes		
West Bletchley	22,213	District and civil parish	City of Milton Keynes		
West Wycombe	1,345	Village and civil parish	Wycombe District		Civil parish includes hamlet of Booker
Westbury	447	Village and civil parish	Aylesbury Vale		
Westcott	448	Village and civil parish	Aylesbury Vale		
Westlington		Hamlet (in Dinton-with-Ford and Upton civil parish)	Aylesbury Vale		
Weston Turville	3,127	Village and civil parish	Aylesbury Vale		Civil parish includes hamlet of Bye Green
Weston Underwood	239	Village and civil parish	City of Milton Keynes		
Wexham	2,378	Civil parish	South Bucks District		Civil parish includes hamlets of George Green, Middlegreen and Wexham Street
Whaddon	533	Village and civil parish	Aylesbury Vale		.
Whaddon, Milton Keynes		Ward in West Bletchley	City of Milton Keynes		
Wheeler End		Hamlet (in Piddington and Wheeler End civil parish)	Wycombe District		
Whelpley Hill		Hamlet (in Ashley Green civil parish)	Chiltern District		
Whitchurch	932	Village and civil parish	Aylesbury Vale		
Whiteleaf		Hamlet (in Princes Risborough civil parish	Wycombe District		
Widmer End		Hamlet (in Hughenden civil parish)	Wycombe District		
Widmoor	160	Hamlet (in Wooburn civil parish)	Wycombe District		
Willen		District in Milton Keynes (in Campbell Park (civil parish)	City of Milton Keynes		
Winchbottom		Hamlet (in Little Marlow civil parish)	Wycombe District		
Winchmore Hill		Hamlet (in Penn civil parish)	Chiltern District		
Wing	2,745	Village and civil parish	Aylesbury Vale		
Wingrave		Village (in Wingrave with Rowsham civil parish)	Aylesbury Vale		
Wingrave with Rowsham		Civil parish	Aylesbury Vale		Civil parish includes village of Wingrave and hamlet of Rowsham
Winslow	4,407	Market town and civil parish	Aylesbury Vale		
Winterhill		District (in Campbell Park (civil parish)	City of Milton Keynes		
Woburn Sands	2,916	Town and civil parish	City of Milton Keynes		Settlement includes part of the civil parish of Aspley Guise in Bedfordshire.
Wolverton		Town (in Wolverton and Greenleys civil parish)	City of Milton Keynes		
Wolverton and Greenleys	12,492	Civil parish	City of Milton Keynes		Civil parish includes Greenleys, Wolverton, Old Wolverton, and Wolverton Mill
Wooburn		Village (in Wooburn civil parish)	Wycombe District		
Wooburn	10,172	Civil parish	Wycombe District		
Wooburn Green		Village (in Wooburn civil parish)	Wycombe District		
Wooburn Moor		Hamlet (in Wooburn civil parish)	Wycombe District		
Woodham	64	Hamlet and civil parish	Aylesbury Vale		
Woodrow		Hamlet (in Amersham civil parish)	Chiltern District		
Woolstone		District (in Campbell Park (civil parish)	City of Milton Keynes		Includes Great Woolstone and Little Woolstone
World's End		Hamlet (in Wendover civil parish)	Aylesbury Vale		
Worminghall	534	Village and civil parish	Aylesbury Vale		
Wotton Underwood	119	Village and civil parish	Aylesbury Vale		
Woughton		Civil parish	City of Milton Keynes		Woughton was formed after Woughton-on-the-Green was split into Old Woughton and Woughton. Population of this parish is awaited
Woughton on the Green		Village (in Old Woughton civil parish)	City of Milton Keynes		
Woughton-on-the-Green (civil parish)		Former civil parish	City of Milton Keynes		This historic parish was split into Old Woughton and Woughton civil parishes in May 2012
Wormstone		Hamlet (in Waddesdon civil parish)	Aylesbury Vale		
Wycombe Marsh		Hamlet (unparished) within High Wycombe	Wycombe District		

Note: Population normally available for civil parishes, unavailable for constituent villages and hamlets

== Former settlements ==
Flaunden village was moved in the early 19th century across the county boundary and into Hertfordshire.

Towersey village was transferred to Oxfordshire in 1933, when the county boundary was moved.

Slough, Eton and Datchet were transferred to Berkshire in 1974, when the north eastern corner of the country boundary was moved a few miles northwards.

== See also ==
- List of Buckinghamshire boundary changes
- Places of interest in Buckinghamshire
- List of civil parishes in Buckinghamshire
- List of places in England
- List of towns and cities in England by population
