= Waldridge =

Waldridge may refer to:

- Waldridge, Buckinghamshire
- Waldridge, County Durham
