= Forty Green =

Forty Green is the name of more than one hamlet in Buckinghamshire, England:

- Forty Green, Bledlow
- Forty Green, Marlow
- Forty Green, Penn
