= Heath End, Buckinghamshire =

Hamlet in Buckinghamshire, England

Coordinates: 51.676°N 0.729°W

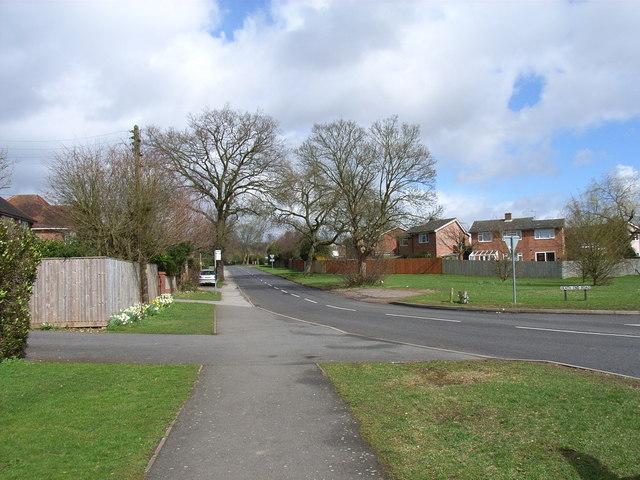
Heath End Road, Great Kingshill, 2006

Heath End is a hamlet in the parish of Great Missenden in Buckinghamshire, England. At the 2011 Census the population of the hamlet was included in the civil parish of Little Missenden. During the 20th century, it became attached to Great Kingshill to the south west. The old centre of the hamlet is where Spurlands End Road meets Heath End Road. Although Heath End is now attached to Great Kingshill there are still road signs indicating to the hamlet.

The hamlet's name is derived from being historically located at the edge of a large area of heathland (now vanished) called Wycombe Heath or Holmer Heath which once covered several thousand acres to the south.

There is some evidence in the Cartulary of Missenden Abbey that the hamlet was once known as Birchmere.
