= Bacombe and Coombe Hills =

Protected area in Buckinghamshire, England

Coordinates: 51.7534°N 0.7671°W

- Site of Special Scientific Interest
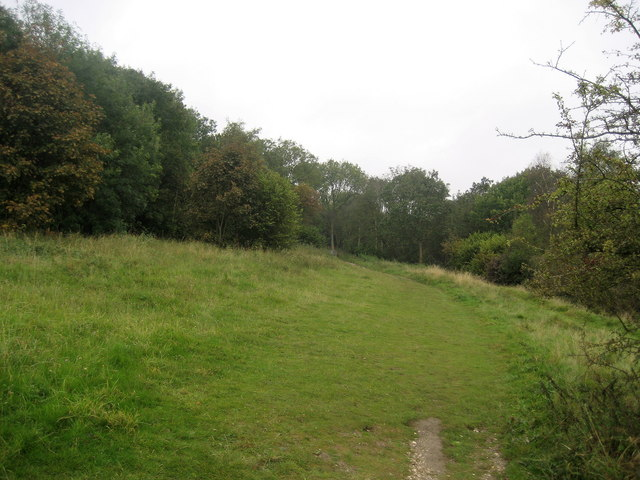
- Ridgeway on Bacombe Hill
- Location of Bacombe and Coombe Hills.
- Area of search: Buckinghamshire
- Grid reference: SP852068
- Interest: Biological
- Area: 76.4 ha (189 acres)
- Notification date: 1999
- Location map: Magic Map

Bacombe and Coombe Hills is a 76.4-hectare (189-acre) biological Site of Special Scientific Interest in Upper Bacombe in Buckinghamshire. Bacombe Hill was formerly owned by Buckinghamshire County Council, which transferred it to Berkshire, Buckinghamshire and Oxfordshire Wildlife Trust in 2014. Coombe Hill is owned by the National Trust.

The site is in the Chilterns Area of Outstanding Natural Beauty and Bacombe Hill is a Local Nature Reserve. The Ridgeway National Trail crosses the site.

The site is chalk grassland which has a rich variety of species. including the entire British population of Chiltern gentian, and there are areas of juniper and mixed scrub. Invertebrates include scarce species, such as chalkhill blue and brown argus butterflies. Bacombe Hill is noted for orchids.

There is access from Ellesbrough Road.
