= North Lee =

Hamlet in Buckinghamshire, England

Coordinates: 51.771°N 0.790°W

North Lee is a hamlet in the parish of Ellesborough, in Buckinghamshire, England. It is located in the very north of the parish, near the main road that links Aylesbury with Wendover.

The hamlet name is a compound of English and Anglo Saxon languages, and refers to the northernmost clearing. The name refers to the adjacent hamlet of Nash Lee.

Today North Lee has survived more or less unscathed from the construction of the Wendover Bypass, though the road that leads to North Lee is now a dead end rather than a through road to Wendover.

== Archaeology ==
Five flint flakes dated between the Neolithic to Bronze Age were found in North Lee. In addition, there is evidence of a possible medieval moat recorded in an aerial photograph.
