= Piddington and Wheeler End =

Civil parish in Buckinghamshire, England

Coordinates: 51.634459°N 0.830212°W

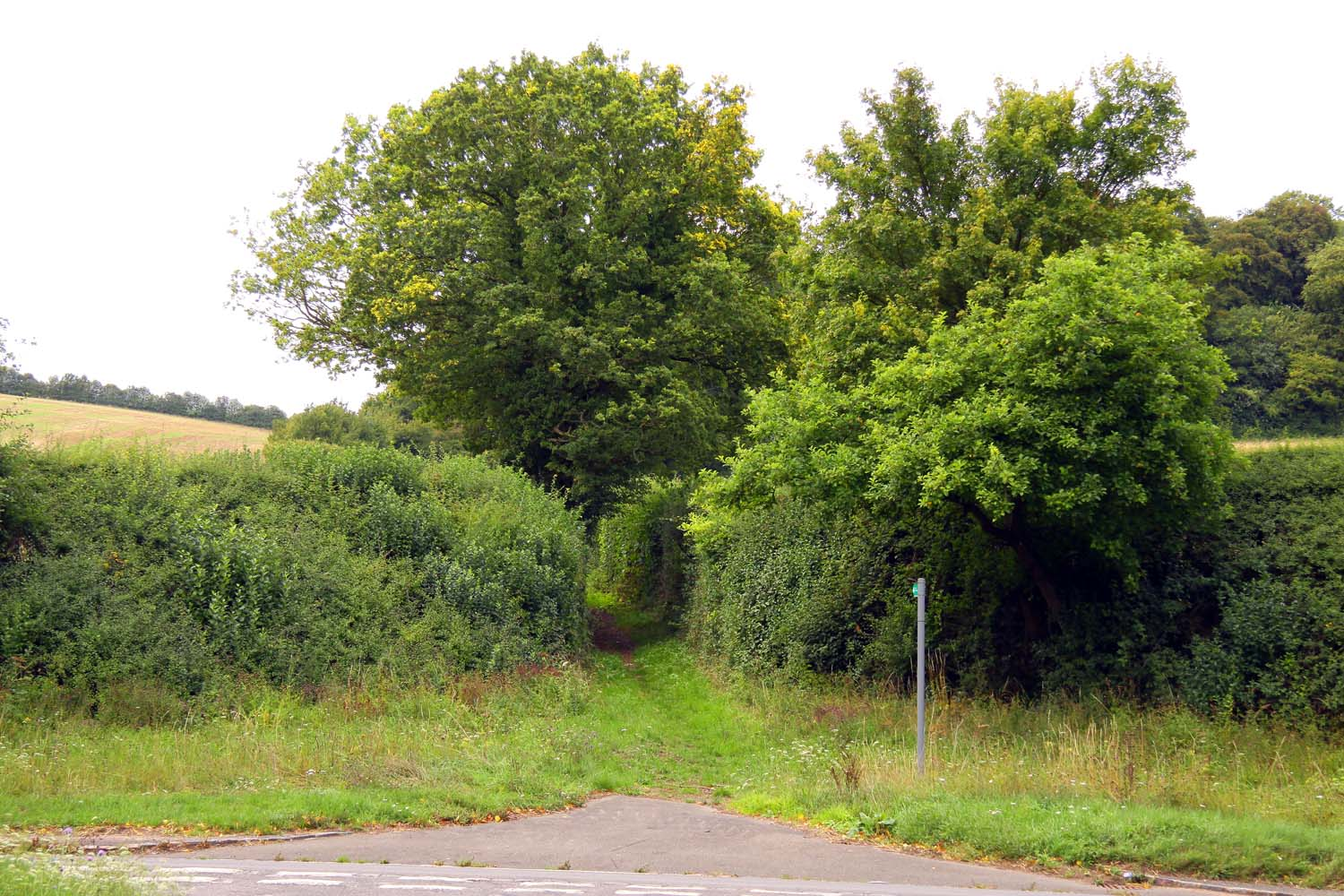
- Bridleway at Piddington, 2010

- Location within Buckinghamshire
- Population: 651; 630 (2011 Census)
- OS grid reference: SU809935
- Civil parish: Piddington and Wheeler End
- Unitary authority: Buckinghamshire
- Ceremonial county: Buckinghamshire
- Region: South East
- Country: England
- Sovereign state: United Kingdom
- Post town: High Wycombe
- Postcode district: HP14
- Dialling code: 01494
- Police: Thames Valley
- Fire: Buckinghamshire
- Ambulance: South Central
- UK Parliament: Wycombe

Piddington and Wheeler End is a small civil parish within Wycombe District Council, Buckinghamshire, England. Within the parish are the main hamlets of Piddington and Wheeler End. The total voting population of the parish is 630.

The parish council administers the common land in both villages including three popular allotment sites. It is also responsible for the war memorial at Wheeler End. The parish council together with the village hall publish a quarterly newsletter which goes out to the entire parish.
