= Ditchfield =

Ditchfield is an English surname shared by:

- Andy Ditchfield, founder of English rock band DeeExpus
- Jimmy Ditchfield, 19th century football player for Burslem Port Vale F.C.
- Right Rev. Dr. John Edwin Watts Ditchfield (1861–1923), first Church of England Bishop of Chelmsford
- Rev. Dr. Peter Ditchfield (1854–1930), Church of England priest, local historian and editor of the Berkshire volumes of the Victoria County History
