= Dadford =

Hamlet in Buckinghamshire, England

Coordinates: 52.040°N 1.029°W

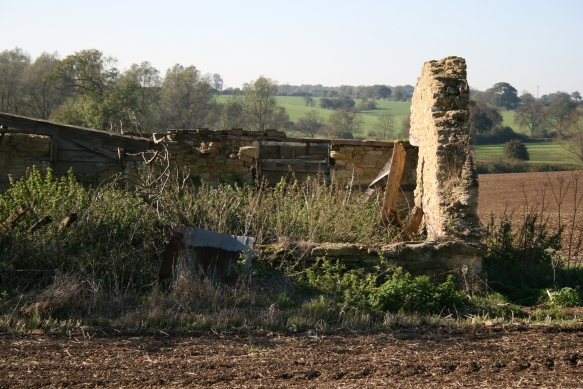
A derelict barn in Dadford

Dadford is a hamlet in the parish of Stowe, north Buckinghamshire, England.

The hamlet is named Anglo Saxon in origin, meaning, Dodda's Ford in modern English. Although, originally in the parish of Biddlesden, the hamlet was annexed to Stowe in the 17th century to provide extra living accommodation for the servants of the new manor house.

The hamlet still exists today, though it remains quite small in size. It has never had a public house but had a shop and post office until the 1980s. It has retained an iconic red telephone kiosk.
