= Burcott, Bierton =

Hamlet in Buckinghamshire, England

Coordinates: 51.828980°N 0.778479°W

Burcott
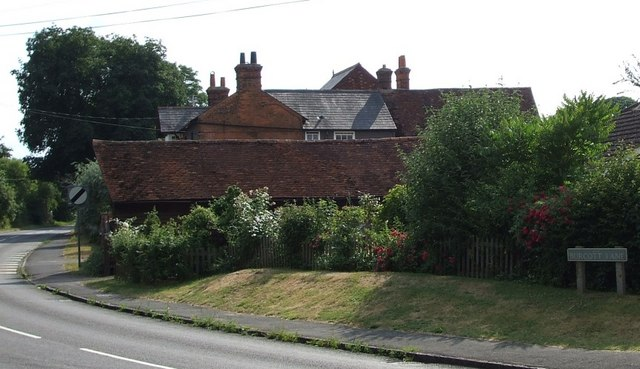
- A farm on the corner in Burcott, just south of Bierton, 2006

- Location within Buckinghamshire
- OS grid reference: SP8415
- Civil parish: Bierton
- Unitary authority: Buckinghamshire
- Ceremonial county: Buckinghamshire
- Region: South East
- Country: England
- Sovereign state: United Kingdom
- Post town: AYLESBURY
- Postcode district: HP22
- Dialling code: 01296
- Police: Thames Valley
- Fire: Buckinghamshire
- Ambulance: South Central
- UK Parliament: Aylesbury

Burcott is a hamlet in the civil parish of Bierton, in Buckinghamshire, England. Until 2020 it was in Bierton with Broughton parish.

Its name is common one England, and refers to a fortified cottage. This is probably the stronghold referred to in the place name of Bierton. Adversely Bierton is now the larger place while Burcott has hardly grown at all.

Today the hamlet has been completely swallowed up by the growth of Bierton village, though it is still marked on modern maps. The playing field on which stands Bierton Scout hut marks the boundary between the village and the hamlet.
