= Ford, Buckinghamshire =

Hamlet in Buckinghamshire, England

Coordinates: 51.777°N 0.872°W

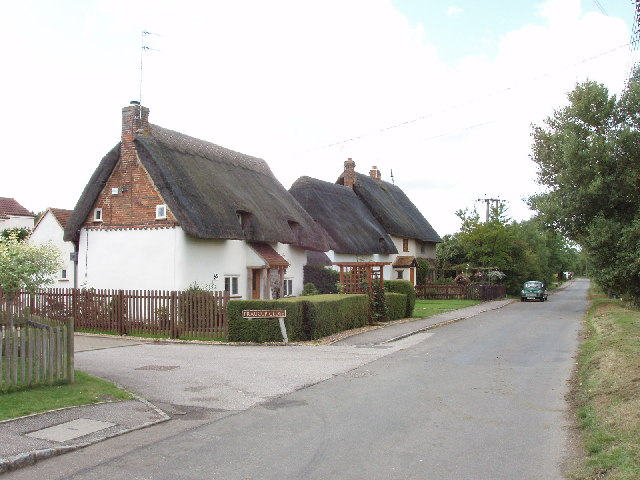
Thatched cottages in Ford

Ford is a hamlet in the parish of Dinton-with-Ford and Upton, in Buckinghamshire, England. It is located in the south eastern corner of the parish.

The place name is Anglo Saxon in origin and refers simply to the place where a stream crosses the main road via a ford.

The 16th Century pub in Ford, previously closed but now reopened under new ownership, is named after The Dinton Hermit. As well as being an old coaching inn on the main route between Aylesbury and Thame, it is one of several Grade II listed buildings in Ford. The barn, now converted into hotel bedrooms, is built mostly of witchert - a local material.

Every Wednesday and Friday morning at 10:30 a bus runs from the Dinton Hermit crossroads into Aylesbury, returning at approximately 13:30.

Ford has a main road which comes from a crossroad on the Ford Road (Which runs from Hartwell to Haddenham) It continues to Dinton, Buckinghamshire in the North and Askett in the South. It has a crossroad where Water Lane and Chapel Road intersect with the main road.
