= Bennett End =

Hamlet in Buckinghamshire, England

Coordinates: 51.668°N 0.870°W

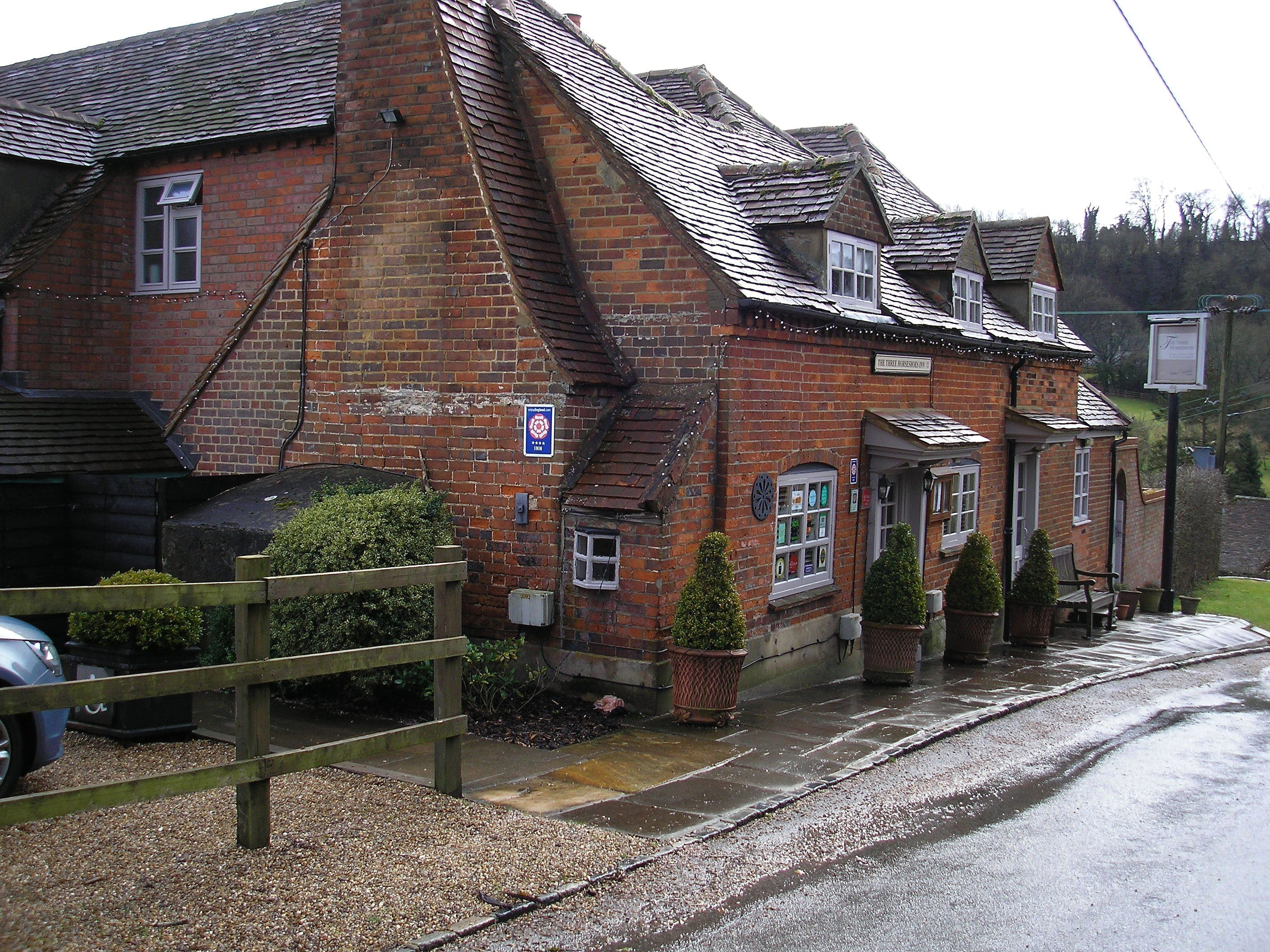
- The Three Horseshoes, Bennet End, 2013

- Location within Buckinghamshire
- OS grid reference: SU782971
- Unitary authority: Buckinghamshire
- Ceremonial county: Buckinghamshire
- Region: South East
- Country: England
- Sovereign state: United Kingdom
- Post town: high wycombe
- Postcode district: HP14
- Dialling code: 01494
- Police: Thames Valley
- Fire: Buckinghamshire
- Ambulance: South Central

Bennett End is a hamlet near Radnage and Bledlow Ridge in Buckinghamshire, England. At the 2011 Census the population of the hamlet was included in the civil parish of Lane End.
