= Shipton Lee =

Hamlet in Buckinghamshire, England

Coordinates: 51.883°N 0.939°W

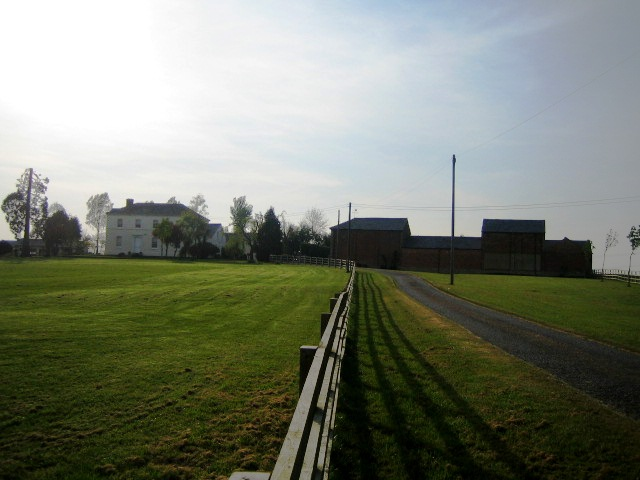
- Lee House and Middle Farm, Shipton Lee, 2007

- Location within Buckinghamshire
- Civil parish: Quainton
- Unitary authority: Buckinghamshire
- Ceremonial county: Buckinghamshire
- Region: South East
- Country: England
- Sovereign state: United Kingdom

Shipton Lee is a hamlet in the civil parish of Quainton, in Buckinghamshire, England.

Shipton Lee was historically part of the ancient parish of Quainton. Parish functions under the poor laws were administered separately for the hamlet of Shipton Lee and the rest of the parish. As such, Shipton Lee became a separate civil parish from Quainton in 1866 when the legal definition of 'parish' was changed to be the areas used for administering the poor laws. In 1886 the civil parish was abolished and its area absorbed into the civil parish of Quainton, in effect reuniting the ancient parish. At the 1881 census (the last before the abolition of the civil parish), Shipton Lee had a population of 61.
