= Wheeler End =

Hamlet in Buckinghamshire, England

Coordinates: 51.631°N 0.839°W

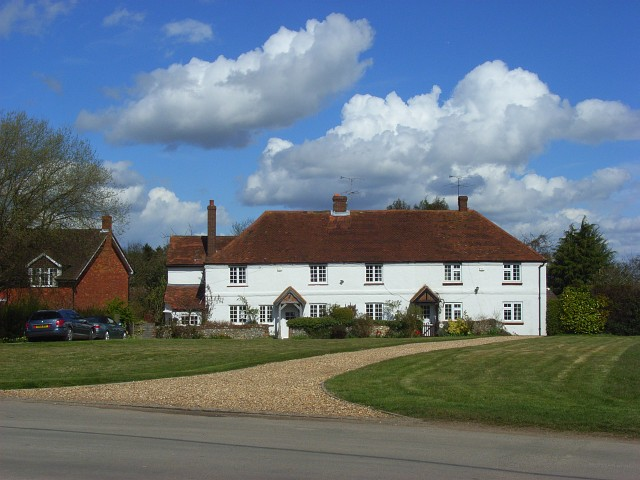
Cottages, Wheeler End, 2008

Wheeler End is a hamlet in the parish of Piddington and Wheeler End, in Buckinghamshire, England. The hamlet is located close to the main A40 between West Wycombe and Stokenchurch.

The hamlet name refers to the Wheeler family, who lived here. They were once the main brewers of High Wycombe. The hamlet itself however, is much older, dating back to the Anglo-Saxon period.

Wheeler End is a collection of terraced houses and free standing properties surrounding the village common. The Common and most of the arable land surrounding the properties in the hamlet are owned by the West Wycombe Estates of Sir Edward Dashwood, Bt. There are no shops in Wheeler End, the nearest shops being either in West Wycombe or in Lane End. There is one public house in Wheeler End, The Chequers Inn.
