= Mop End =

Coordinates: 51.664464°N 0.665274°W

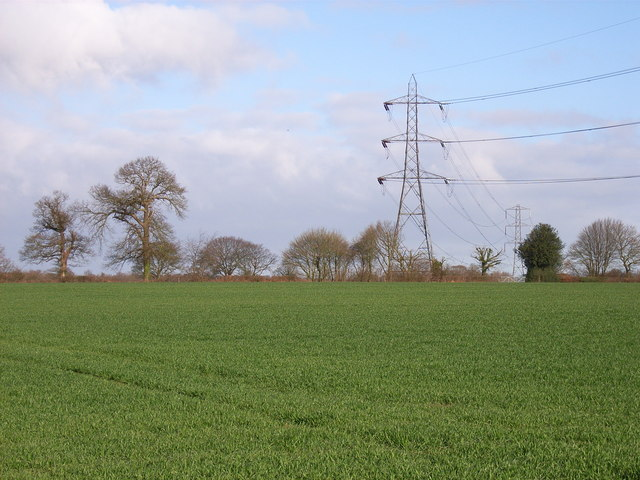
- Farmland at Mop End

- Location within Buckinghamshire
- OS grid reference: SU923970
- Unitary authority: Buckinghamshire
- Ceremonial county: Buckinghamshire
- Region: South East
- Country: England
- Sovereign state: United Kingdom
- Post town: Amersham
- Postcode district: HP7
- Police: Thames Valley
- Fire: Buckinghamshire
- Ambulance: South Central

Mop End is a small hamlet in the parish of Little Missenden, in Buckinghamshire, England. At the 2011 Census, the population of the hamlet was included in the civil parish of Amersham.

It is best known as the location of the Amersham Field Centre sited at the National Grid substation in nearby woodland.

In former times, Mop End was the location of an ancient Inn called The Griffin.

In March 2020, Mop End appeared in a Google UK advertisement for the Pixel 4, featuring comedians Jack Whitehall and Michael Dapaah.
