= Hampden Row =

Hamlet in Buckinghamshire, England

Coordinates: 51°42′N 0°46′W

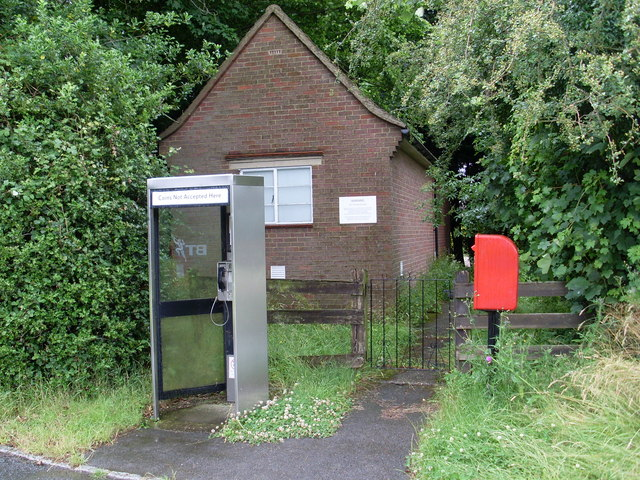
Telephone Exchange, Great Hampden Is located in Memorial Road, and was previously named Hampden Row, 2008

Hampden Row is a hamlet in the Chiltern Hills of Buckinghamshire, England. It is located in Great Hampden parish. At the 2011 Census the population of the hamlet was included in the civil parish of Great and Little Hampden. The hamlet has been described as being "...just an inn and a handful of cottages."

== Notable people ==
- John Masefield was known to have lived in Hampden Row.
