= Southend, Buckinghamshire =

Hamlet in Buckinghamshire, England

Coordinates: 51.601086°N 0.913381°W

Southend
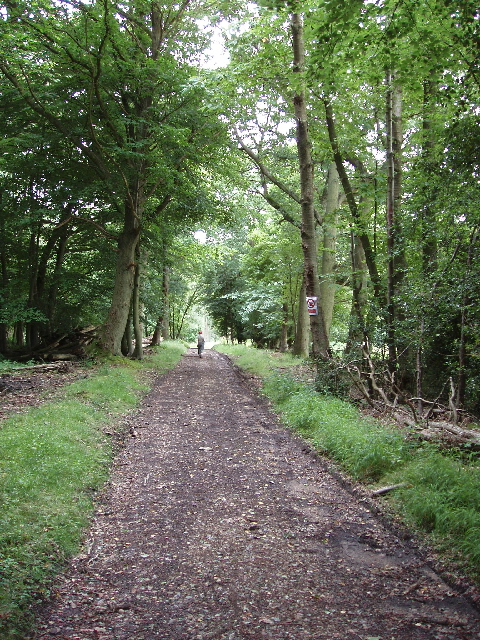
- Woodland track from Southend into Stonor Park

- Location within Buckinghamshire
- OS grid reference: SU752897
- Civil parish: Turville
- Unitary authority: Buckinghamshire
- Ceremonial county: Buckinghamshire
- Region: South East
- Country: England
- Sovereign state: United Kingdom
- Post town: Henley-on-Thames
- Postcode district: RG9
- Dialling code: 01491
- Police: Thames Valley
- Fire: Buckinghamshire
- Ambulance: South Central
- UK Parliament: Wycombe

Southend is a hamlet, in the civil parish of Turville near to the village of the same name in Buckinghamshire, England. It lies in the Chiltern Hills at an elevation of 188m near the Oxfordshire border above and to the west of the Hambleden Valley.

There are some houses and cottages around a rough village green and two small ponds.
