= Littleworth Common =

Protected area in Buckinghamshire, England

Coordinates: 51.567374°N 0.65168°W

- Site of Special Scientific Interest
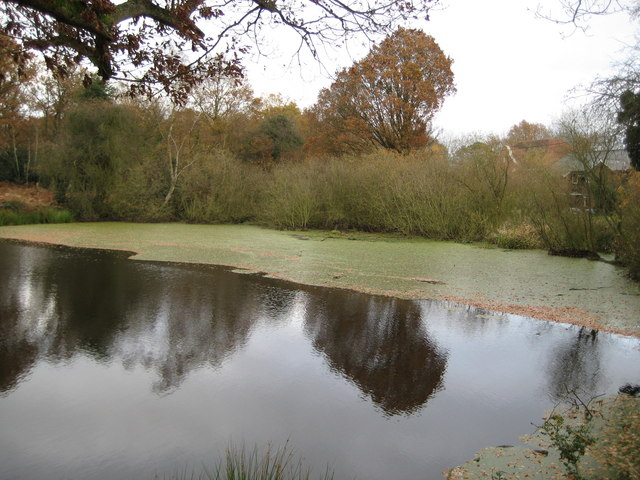
- Location of Littleworth Common.
- Area of search: Buckinghamshire
- Grid reference: SU930865
- Interest: Biological
- Area: 16.1 ha (40 acres)
- Notification date: 1986
- Location map: Magic Map

Littleworth Common is a 16.1-hectare (40-acre) biological Site of Special Scientific Interest west of Farnham Common in Buckinghamshire. It is Common land owned by South Bucks District Council.

The site was formerly open heathland, most of which has developed into birch and oak woodland. Some remnants of acid heathland survive, and marshy areas and two large ponds have uncommon communities, including the nationally rare starfruit. Wet flushes have extensive bog mosses. Purple hairstreak butterfly larvae feed on the oak trees.

There is pedestrian access onto footpaths through the site from Dorney Wood Road, Boveney Wood Lane and Common Lane with a small car park opposite the pub on Common Lane.
