= Upper and Lower Bacombe =

Hamlets in Buckinghamshire, England

Coordinates: 51.749°N 0.760°W

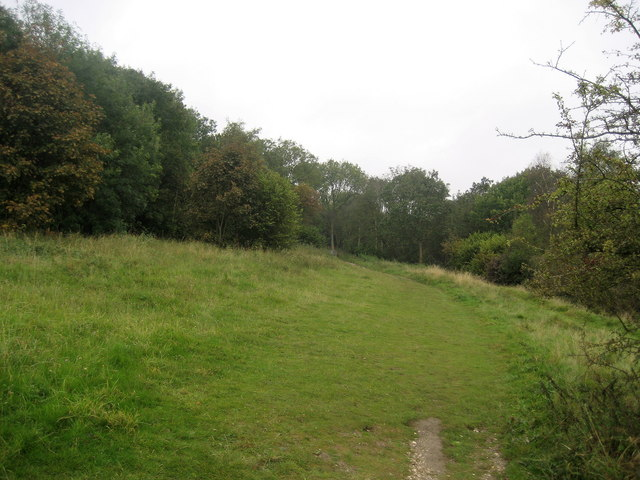
Ridgeway on Bacombe Hill

Upper Bacombe and Lower Bacombe are two hamlets in the parish of Wendover, in Buckinghamshire, England. They are located to the south east of the main town, on and at the foot of Bacombe Hill, which is a Local Nature Reserve, and part of the Bacombe and Coombe Hills Site of Special Scientific Interest.
