= Winchmore Hill, Buckinghamshire =

Village in Buckinghamshire, England

Coordinates: 51.646921°N 0.650645°W

Winchmore Hill
- Location within Buckinghamshire
- OS grid reference: SU933951
- Civil parish: Penn
- Unitary authority: Buckinghamshire
- Ceremonial county: Buckinghamshire
- Region: South East
- Country: England
- Sovereign state: United Kingdom
- Post town: Amersham
- Postcode district: HP7
- Dialling code: 01494
- Police: Thames Valley
- Fire: Buckinghamshire
- Ambulance: South Central
- UK Parliament: Chesham & Amersham

Winchmore Hill is a village in the parish of Penn, in Buckinghamshire, England.

The village has a triangular green in the centre (on which a fête is held regularly). The houses around the green mainly date from the 20th century. The local village cricket team is Winchmore Hill Cricket Club, which has a large junior section with teams playing in local leagues.
