= Northend, Buckinghamshire =

Village in England

Coordinates: 51.6265°N 0.9395°W

Northend
- Location within Buckinghamshire
- OS grid reference: SU735925
- Civil parish: Turville; Watlington
- District: South Oxfordshire
- Unitary authority: Buckinghamshire
- Shire county: Oxfordshire
- Ceremonial county: Buckinghamshire
- Region: South East
- Country: England
- Sovereign state: United Kingdom
- Post town: HENLEY-ON-THAMES
- Postcode district: RG9
- Police: Thames Valley
- Fire: Buckinghamshire
- Ambulance: South Central
- UK Parliament: Wycombe; Henley

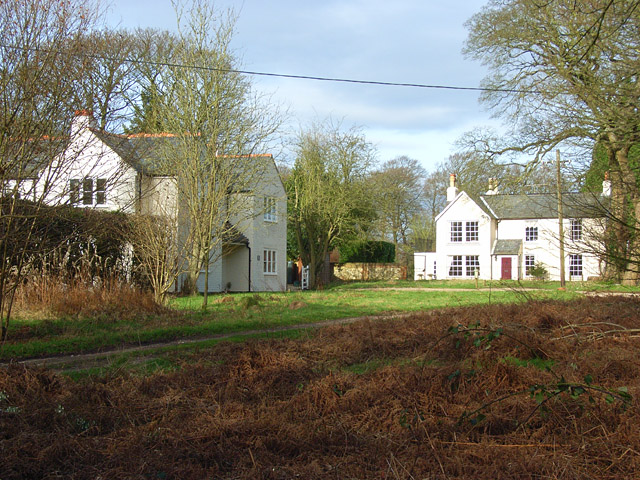
Northend, Buckinghamshire in 2011. Bracken is visible in the foreground.

Northend is a village that straddles the border of the two English counties of Buckinghamshire and Oxfordshire. The eastern half is in the civil parish of Turville in Buckinghamshire, while the western half is across the border into Oxfordshire, in the Watlington parish.
