= Green Hailey =

Hamlet in Buckinghamshire, England

Coordinates: 51.721°N 0.802°W

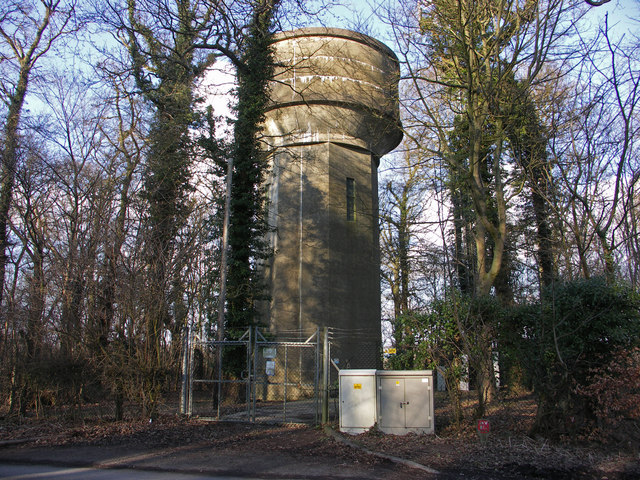
Green Hailey Water Tower, 2006

Green Hailey is a hamlet in the parish of Great and Little Hampden, in Buckinghamshire, England. It is located to the west of the main village of Great Hampden. The hamlet, as of the early 21st century, includes essentially just two cottages and a farm. It was farmed in the late 19th century by Richard Paxton, together with his wife Mary, who together had seven children.

== Relay station ==
Green Hailey was the site of an experimental relay station for television in 1949.
