= Little Meadle =

Hamlet in Buckinghamshire, England

Coordinates: 51.752°N 0.849°W

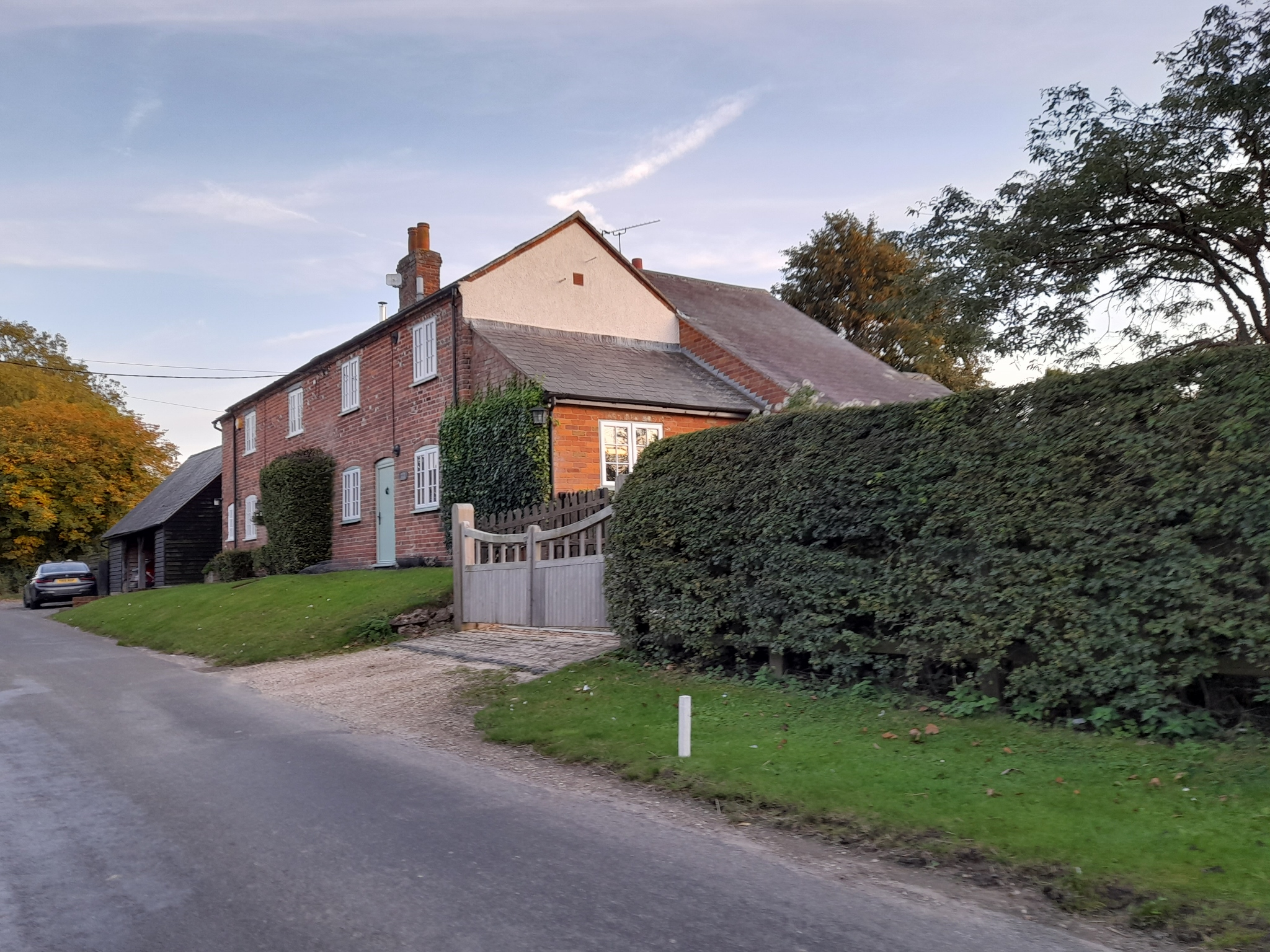
Stockwell Lane, Little Meadle

Little Meadle is a hamlet in Buckinghamshire, England. It is part of the civil parish of Longwick-cum-Ilmer and is located between the hamlets of Owlswick and Meadle (from which it gets its name). It is approximately 5 miles (8.0 km) from Aylesbury and 20 miles (32 km) from Oxford. In addition to the Farm House it consists of a collection of houses built over the past 60 years, and it gained an official name with the Royal Mail in 2004, as well as being mapped with the Ordnance Survey 2006. The term Little Meadle is a relatively new one it has no historical meaning in itself, except that it is close to the village of Meadle and is a small hamlet that was previously known only by the name of the road in which it is situated Stockwell Lane.

Residents within the hamlet are currently in discussions with the local council to have measures introduced in order to combat speeding and avoid the many recent accidents along Stockwell Lane, the Hamlet's main thoroughfare.

Little Meadle contains no commercial establishments and, according to latest estimates, the current resident population is 27, though the number may actually be as high as 35. The area is rich in wildlife. There are large populations of sheep belonging to local farms, and ducks are also very common. Foxes, badgers and grass snakes are also seen from time to time.
