= Hyde End, Buckinghamshire =

Hamlet in Buckinghamshire, England

Coordinates: 51.70108°N 0.66811°W

Hyde End
- Location within Buckinghamshire
- Civil parish: Great Missenden
- Unitary authority: Buckinghamshire
- Ceremonial county: Buckinghamshire
- Region: South East
- Country: England
- Sovereign state: United Kingdom

Hyde End is a small hamlet in the civil parish of Great Missenden, it is located between the hamlets of Hyde Heath and South Heath along the B485 road between Chesham and Great Missenden, in the Chiltern Hills, Buckinghamshire. It comprises a small number of dwellings, including a row of early 1900s cottages, a row of 1930s cottages and larger houses and farm properties.

Two residential properties and an old restaurant in the hamlet were demolished to make way for the HS2 railway line. The midwife and writer Jennifer Worth attended school in the hamlet during the Second World War.
