= Barley End =

Hamlet in Buckinghamshire, England

Coordinates: 51.81°N 00.60°W

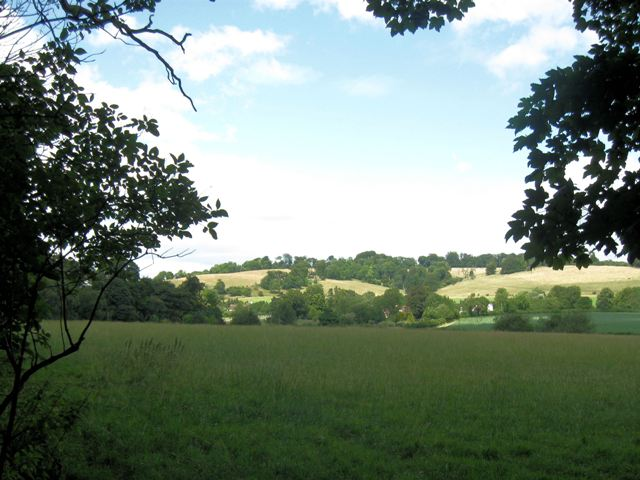
- View across the fields towards Little Barley End, near Aldbury, 2009

- Location within Buckinghamshire
- OS grid reference: SP9614
- Unitary authority: Buckinghamshire
- Ceremonial county: Buckinghamshire
- Region: South East
- Country: England
- Sovereign state: United Kingdom
- Post town: Tring
- Postcode district: HP23
- Police: Thames Valley
- Fire: Buckinghamshire
- Ambulance: South Central

Barley End is a hamlet within the parish of Pitstone in Buckinghamshire, England.
