= Winchbottom =

Hamlet in Buckinghamshire, England

Coordinates: 51.606°N 0.75°W

Winchbottom is a hamlet in the parish of Little Marlow, in Buckinghamshire, England.
