= Orchard Leigh =

Hamlet in Buckinghamshire, England

Coordinates: 51.720°N 0.575°W

Orchard Leigh is a hamlet in the parish of Latimer in Buckinghamshire, England, located along the B4505 about 2 miles east of Chesham. It is in the civil parish of Ashley Green.

Chesham Preparatory School, an independent school for children aged 3 to 13, is based in the hamlet.

The minister and author Reverend Walter Wynn used to reside in Orchard Leigh.
