= Westlington =

Hamlet in Buckinghamshire, England

Coordinates: 51.788°N 0.897°W

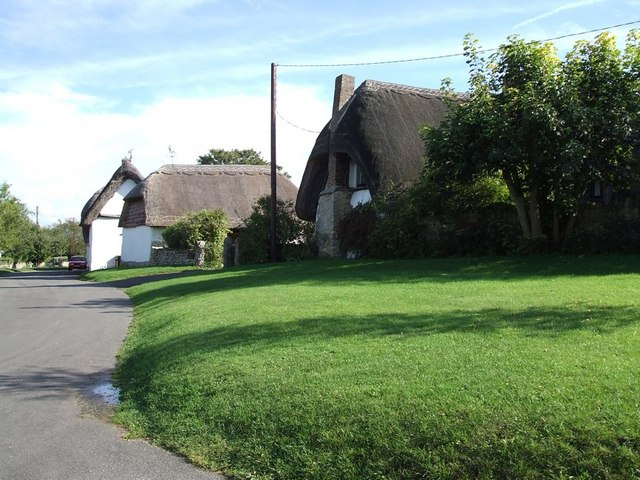
Westlington, 2006

Westlington is a hamlet near the village of Dinton in the civil parish of Dinton-with-Ford and Upton, Buckinghamshire, England.
