= Singleborough =

Hamlet in Buckinghamshire, England

Coordinates: 51.981°N 0.885°W

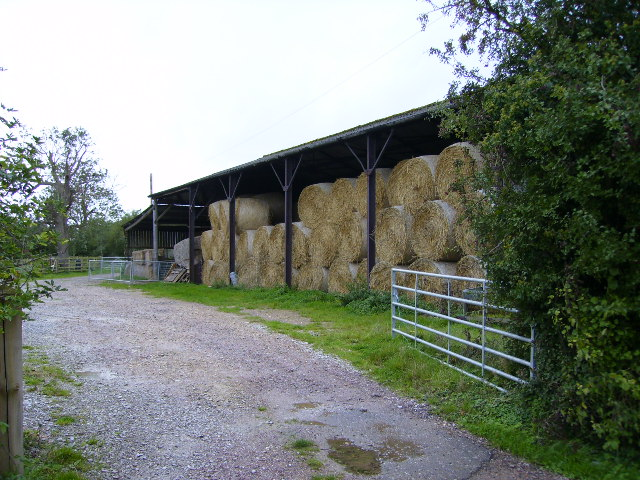
Barn on the outskirts of Singleborough village, 2006

Singleborough is a hamlet in the parish of Great Horwood, in Buckinghamshire, England. It is located about a mile from the main village.

== History ==
The hamlet name is Anglo Saxon in origin, and means 'gravel hill'.

It appears spelt as Synkelburgh, in 1440, on a plea roll of the Court of Common Pleas, where a resident Thomas May, with others, was accused of trespassing on John Carter's land in Great Horwood & assaulting him.
