= Cooks Wharf =

Hamlet in Buckinghamshire, England

Coordinates: 51.836°N 0.655°W

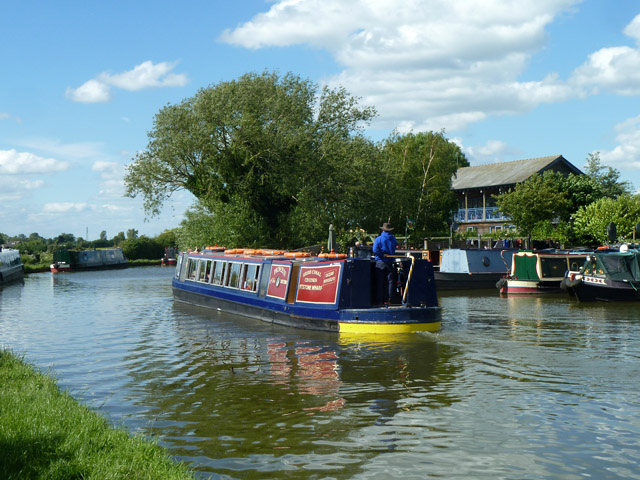
- Grand Union Canal at Cooks Wharf

- Location within Buckinghamshire
- OS grid reference: SP9216
- Civil parish: Cheddington
- Unitary authority: Buckinghamshire
- Ceremonial county: Buckinghamshire
- Region: South East
- Country: England
- Sovereign state: United Kingdom
- Post town: Leighton Buzzard
- Postcode district: LU7
- Police: Thames Valley
- Fire: Buckinghamshire
- Ambulance: South Central
- UK Parliament: Aylesbury

Cooks Wharf is a hamlet in the parish of Cheddington, in Buckinghamshire, England. It is located where the main road into Cheddington from Pitstone crosses the Grand Union Canal. At the 2011 census the population of the area was included in the civil parish of Marsworth.

Apples from the surrounding orchards were loaded onto the narrowboats here to travel down the canal to London.

Dunstable and District Boat Club is located at the south of Cooks Wharf and provides non-residential leisure moorings.
