= Aston Mullins =

Hamlet in Buckinghamshire, England

Coordinates: 51.768908°N 0.886257°W

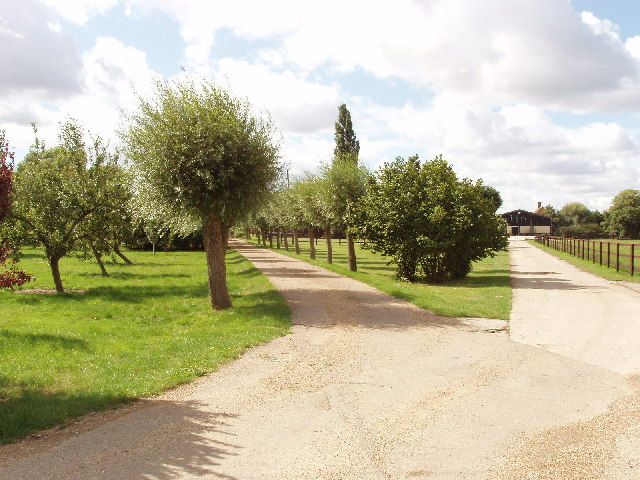
- Aston Mullins Farm, 2005

- Location within Buckinghamshire
- OS grid reference: SP7608
- Civil parish: Dinton-with-Ford and Upton
- Unitary authority: Buckinghamshire
- Ceremonial county: Buckinghamshire
- Region: South East
- Country: England
- Sovereign state: United Kingdom
- Post town: AYLESBURY
- Postcode district: HP17
- Dialling code: 01296
- Police: Thames Valley
- Fire: Buckinghamshire
- Ambulance: South Central
- UK Parliament: Aylesbury

Aston Mullins is a hamlet in the parish of Dinton, in Buckinghamshire, England. At the 2011 Census the population of the hamlet was included in the civil parish of Dinton-with-Ford and Upton
