= Hundridge =

Hamlet in Buckinghamshire, England

Coordinates: 51.706°N 0.652°W

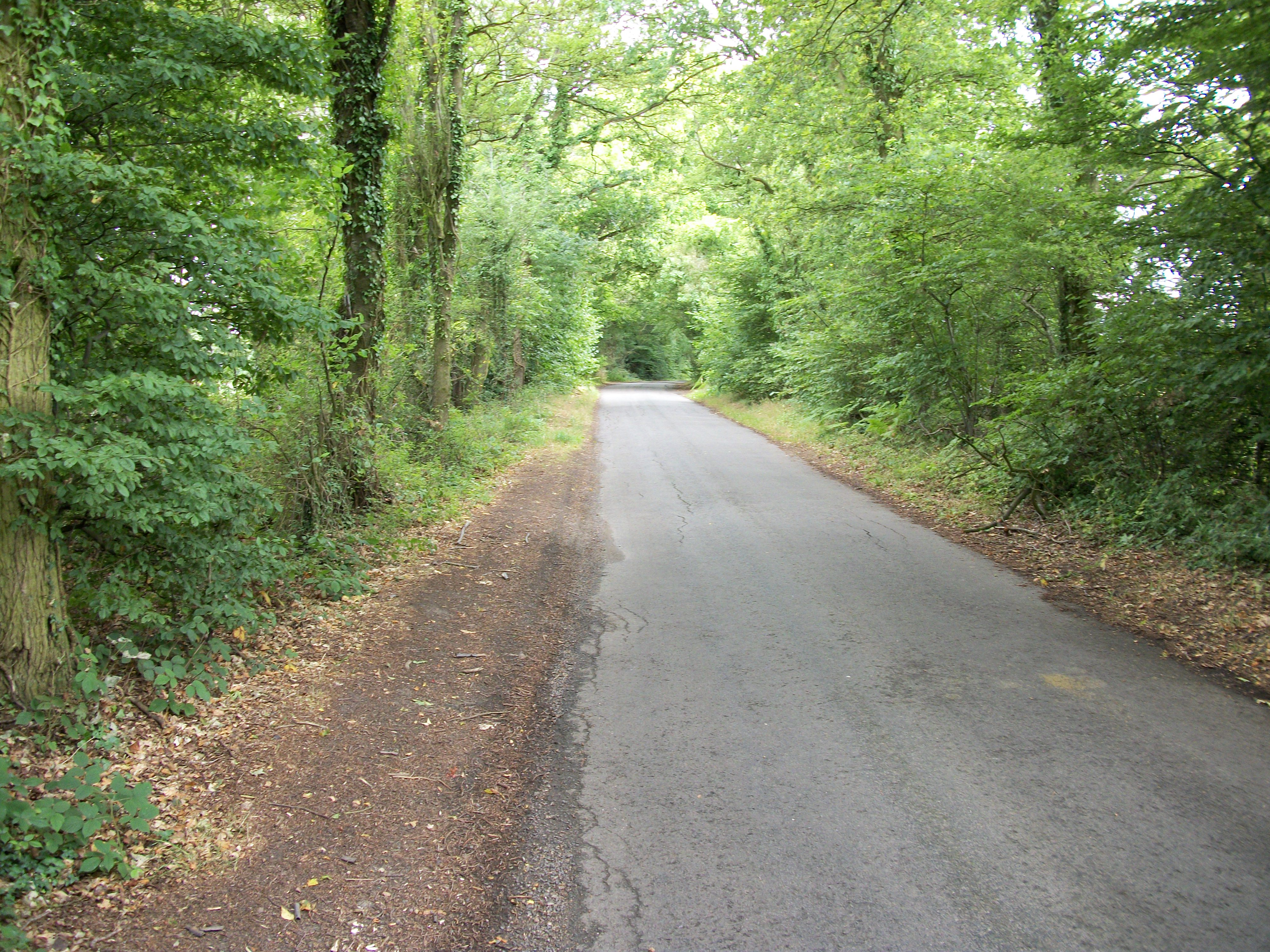
Little Hundridge Lane, 2010

Hundridge is a hamlet in the parish of Chartridge, in Buckinghamshire, England. It is located in the Chiltern Hills to the west of the town of Chesham. During the 14th century it was known as Hunderugge, and Hundrige in the 15th/16th century. The hamlet name derives from either the Anglo Saxon hunda-hrycg meaning 'hounds' ridge', or from Hundan-hrycg meaning 'Hunda's ridge'.

== Chapel ==
Hundridge chapel is a mediaeval building which was used as a place of worship until the Reformation. It is now attached to Hundridge manor.
