= Marsh, Buckinghamshire =

Hamlet in Buckinghamshire, England

Coordinates: 51.778243°N 0.820074°W

Marsh
- Location within Buckinghamshire
- OS grid reference: SP815095
- Civil parish: Great and Little Kimble cum Marsh
- Unitary authority: Buckinghamshire
- Ceremonial county: Buckinghamshire
- Region: South East
- Country: England
- Sovereign state: United Kingdom
- Post town: AYLESBURY
- Postcode district: HP17
- Dialling code: 01296
- Police: Thames Valley
- Fire: Buckinghamshire
- Ambulance: South Central
- UK Parliament: Aylesbury

Marsh is a hamlet in the civil parish of Great and Little Kimble cum Marsh in Buckinghamshire, England. The hamlet name comes from the name of the Earls of Pembroke in the 12th and 13th centuries and was previously called Marshals.

Formerly a parish in its own right, it was annexed into the parish of Great Kimble in the late medieval period when its manor was purchased by Lord Griffith Hampden (ancestor of John Hampden) who was also the lord of Great Kimble manor. In the English Civil War it was reputed that King Charles I of England spent some time in hiding in the pub in the hamlet.

Today the hamlet is just a small collection of houses, a pub and a couple of farms. The name Marsh is also given to the nearby Marsh Level Crossing on the railway line that runs from Princes Risborough to Aylesbury. Marsh is close to the Chiltern hills an area of outstanding beauty, surrounded in wildlife and farms it is a perfect habitat for animals.
