= Alscot =

Coordinates: 51.732797°N 0.838779°W

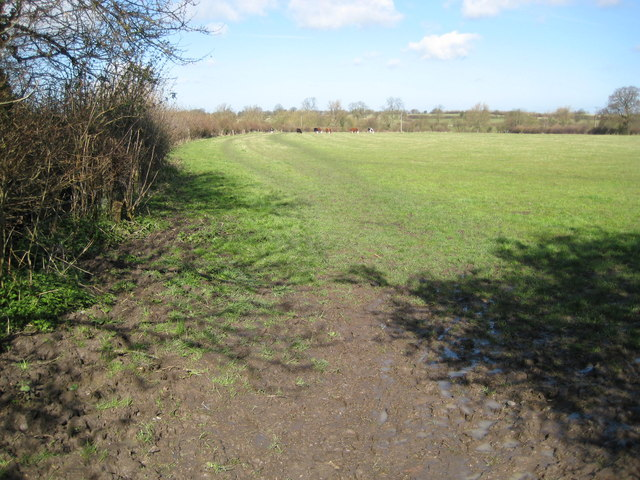
- Monks Risborough, Footpath to Alscot Farm and Chadwell Hill, 2008

- Location within Buckinghamshire
- OS grid reference: SP802044
- Civil parish: Princes Risborough
- Unitary authority: Buckinghamshire
- Ceremonial county: Buckinghamshire
- Region: South East
- Country: England
- Sovereign state: United Kingdom
- Post town: PRINCES RISBOROUGH
- Postcode district: HP27
- Dialling code: 01844
- Police: Thames Valley
- Fire: Buckinghamshire
- Ambulance: South Central
- UK Parliament: Mid Buckinghamshire

Alscot is a hamlet in Buckinghamshire, England. It is in Princes Risborough parish, on the A4129 between Princes Risborough and Longwick.
