= Petsoe End =

Hamlet in Buckinghamshire, England

Coordinates: 52.134°N 0.691°W

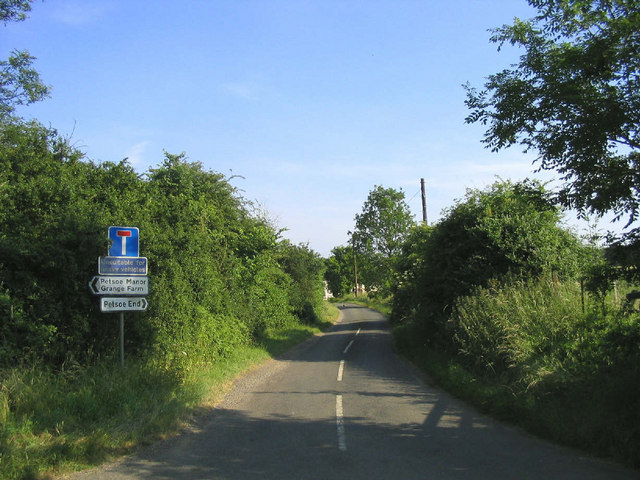
The dead-end road to Petsoe End

Petsoe End is a hamlet in Emberton civil parish, in the City of Milton Keynes, Buckinghamshire, England.

The name Petsoe is used frequently in the local area, with other local hamlets being called Petsoe Manor and Petsoe Lodge.

Petsoe was formerly a separate parish from Emberton, but was annexed to the latter parish in 1650 for ecclesiastical purposes. There was another parish nearby, called Ekeney which was also annexed at the same time, though nothing remains of Ekeney today.

Today nothing remains of Petsoe church, though the landmarkings showing where it once stood are still discernible.
