= Skittle Green =

Hamlet in Buckinghamshire, England

Coordinates: 51.71862°N 0.88387°W

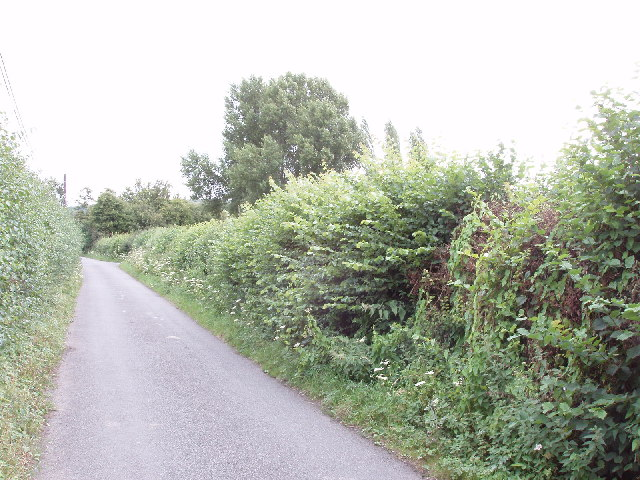
Skittle Green lane, near Bledlow, 2005

Skittle Green is a hamlet in the civil parish of Bledlow-cum-Saunderton in the county of Buckinghamshire, England.

Skittle Green is northwest of the village of Bledlow, very near to the Oxfordshire boundary.
