= Shreding Green =

Hamlet in Buckinghamshire, England

Coordinates: 51.519°N 0.526°W

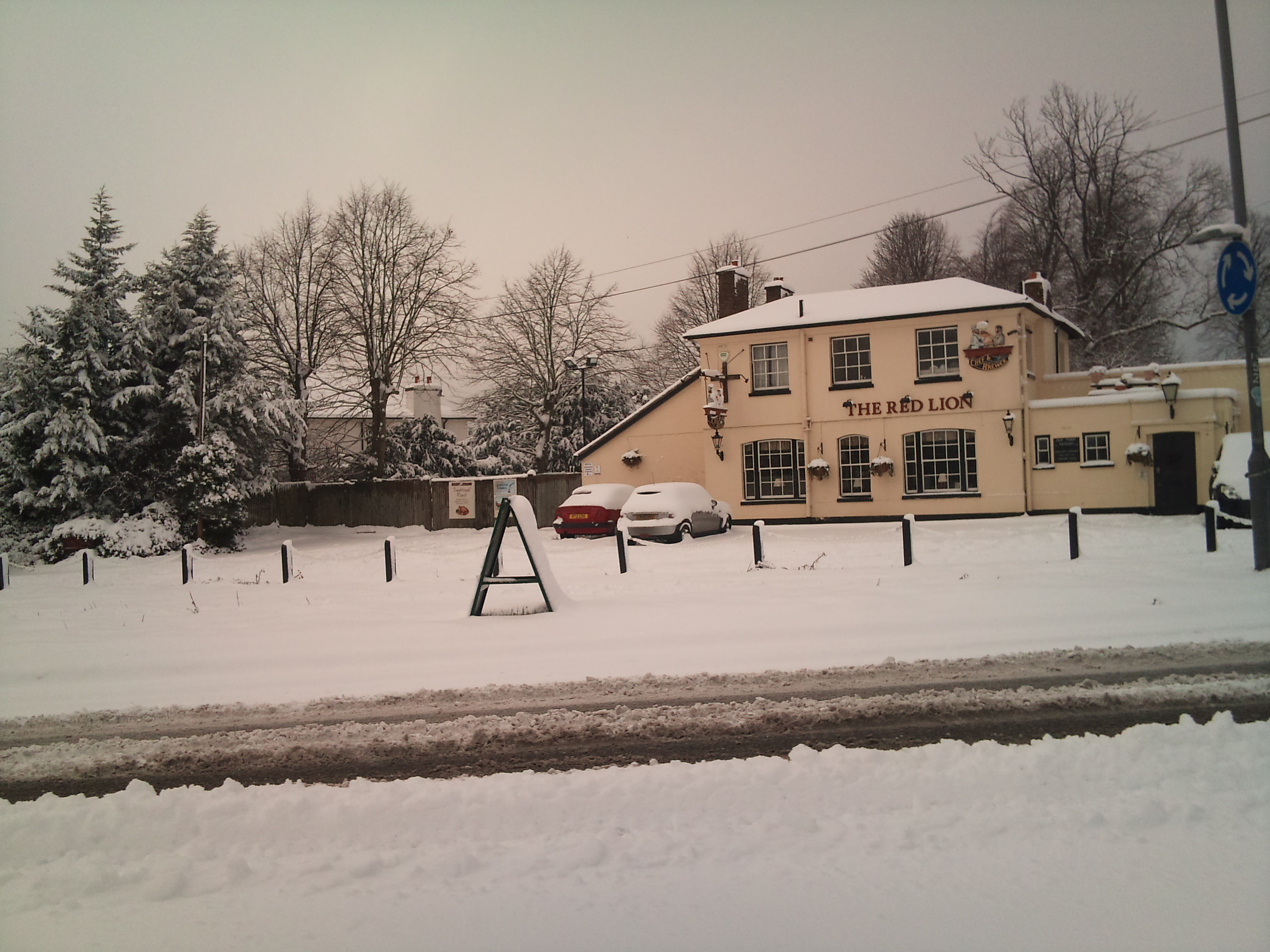
The Red Lion pub in December 2010

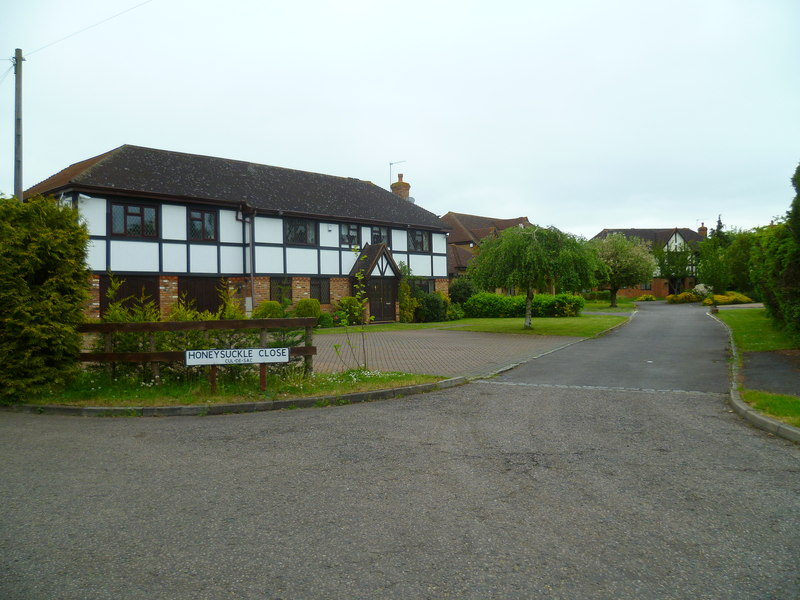
Houses in Shreding Green

Shreding Green is a hamlet in the parish of Iver (where the 2011 Census figures were included), in Buckinghamshire, England.

The area includes a public house called The Red Lion, an early 19th-century building which has been the site of a pub since 1753. It was known as The Gurkha between 1971 and 2000, and featured in the 1971 film Carry On at Your Convenience.
