= Honeyburge =

Hamlet in Buckinghamshire, England

Coordinates: 51.814°N 1.098°W

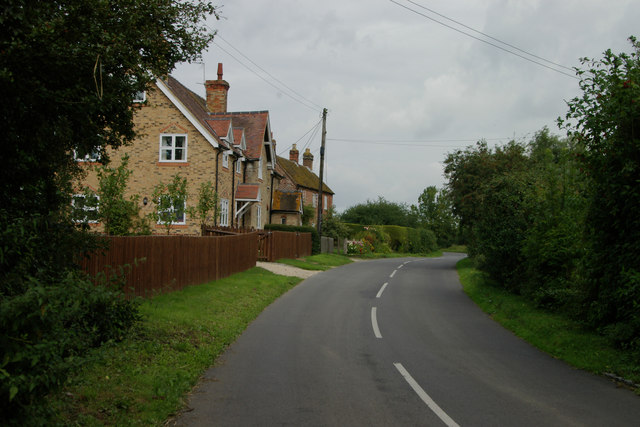

- Location within Buckinghamshire
- OS grid reference: SP623132
- Civil parish: Boarstall
- Unitary authority: Buckinghamshire
- Ceremonial county: Buckinghamshire
- Region: South East
- Country: England
- Sovereign state: United Kingdom
- Post town: Aylesbury
- Postcode district: HP18
- Dialling code: 01844
- Police: Thames Valley
- Fire: Buckinghamshire
- Ambulance: South Central
- UK Parliament: Mid Buckinghamshire

Honeyburge is a hamlet in the civil parish of Boarstall in Buckinghamshire, England. The hamlet is on Dane's Brook next to Boarstall Wood. Honeyburge is 0.25 miles (400 m) east of the M40 motorway, less than 0.5 miles (800 m) south of Boarstall village and about 8 miles (13 km) by road south of the market town of Bicester in neighbouring Oxfordshire.
