= Askett =

Hamlet in Buckinghamshire, England

Coordinates: 51.73°N 00.82°W

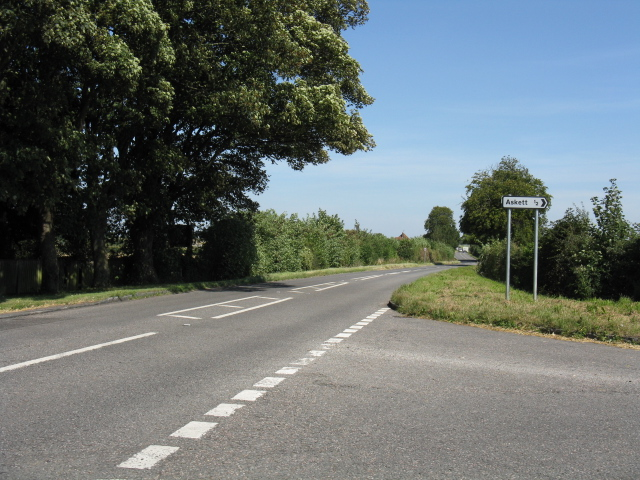
- Askett Junction, B4009

- Location within Buckinghamshire
- OS grid reference: SP8105
- Civil parish: Princes Risborough
- Unitary authority: Buckinghamshire
- Ceremonial county: Buckinghamshire
- Region: South East
- Country: England
- Sovereign state: United Kingdom
- Post town: PRINCES RISBOROUGH
- Postcode district: HP27
- Dialling code: 01844
- Police: Thames Valley
- Fire: Buckinghamshire
- Ambulance: South Central
- UK Parliament: Mid Buckinghamshire

Askett is a hamlet in the civil parish of Princes Risborough, Buckinghamshire, England. It is situated between the Chiltern Hills and the Vale of Aylesbury. It lies within an Area of Outstanding Natural Beauty and Conservation Area

== History ==
The Manor house at Askett sat on the site of Old Manor Close estate. At the beginning of the 20th century small cottages resided on the original land but by 1969 had been demolished and in 1983 five new houses were built.

In the 19th Century, the small hamlet was a renowned village for lacemaking. By the 20th Century, villages like Askett and Kimble became the stopping point on the way to Aylesbury, Dillons Garage was a small well-known service station opened in Askett in 1933 which has since been demolished.

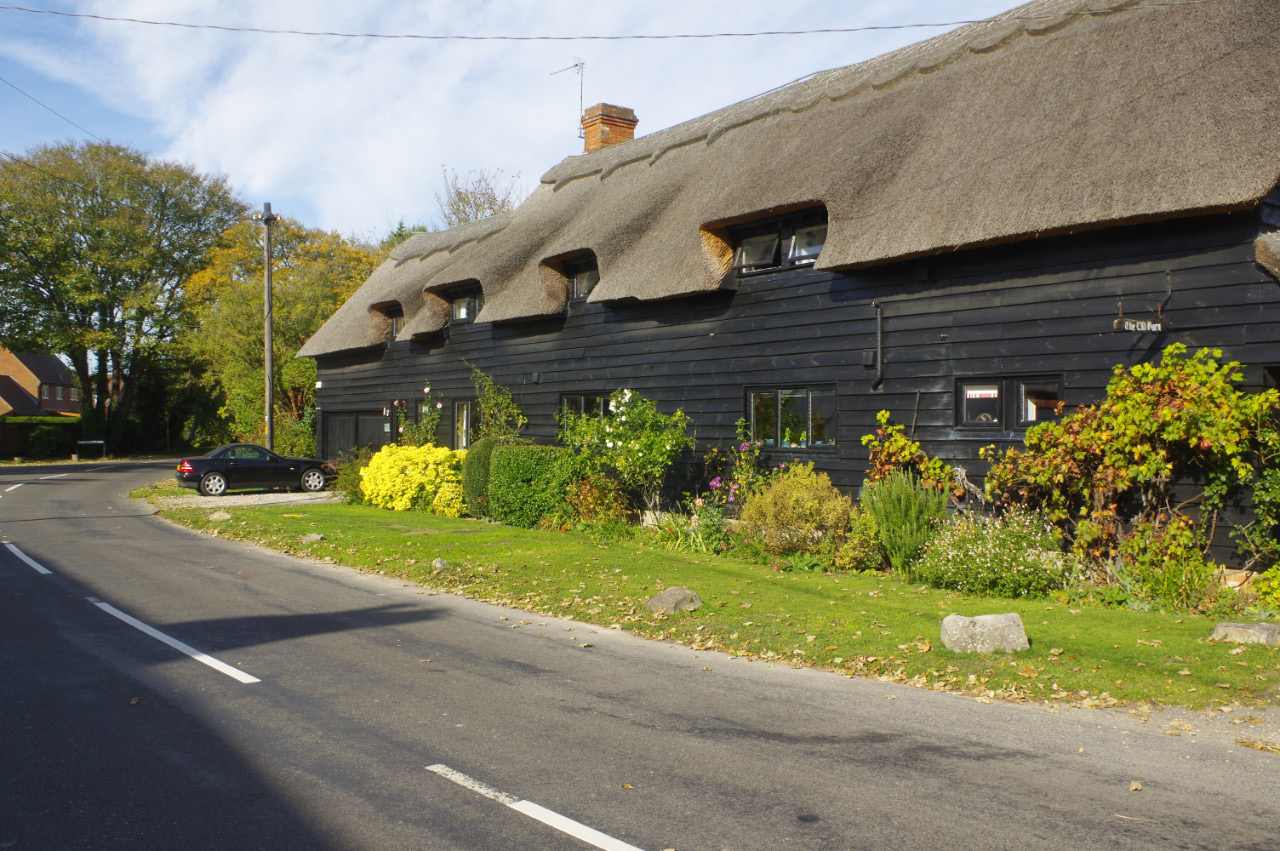
The Old Barn

The village still holds many old fashioned cottages and bungalows. The area has more recently been described as 'A Hamlet in a Meadow'.
