= Wormstone =

Hamlet in Buckinghamshire, England

Coordinates: 51.841°N 0.913°W

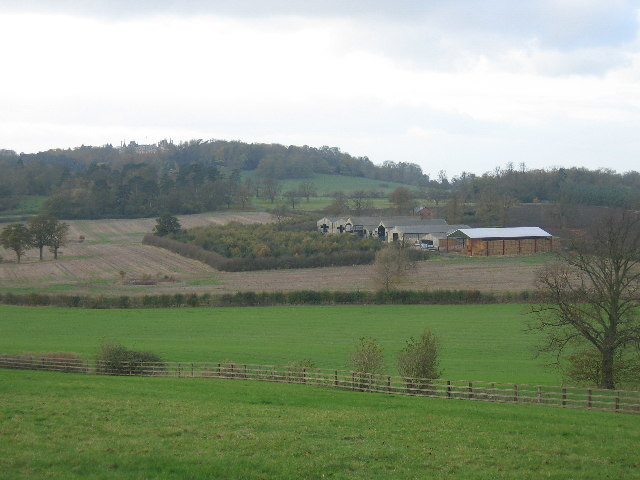
Barns near Wormstone with Waddesdon Manor on sky line

Wormstone (also Warmstone) is a hamlet in the parish of Waddesdon, in Buckinghamshire, England. It is located just south-south east of the main village.

In the 13th and 14th centuries, the hamlet was one fifth of the fiefdom of Wallingford.
