= Beamond End =

Hamlet in Buckinghamshire, England

Coordinates: 51.661988°N 0.678964°W

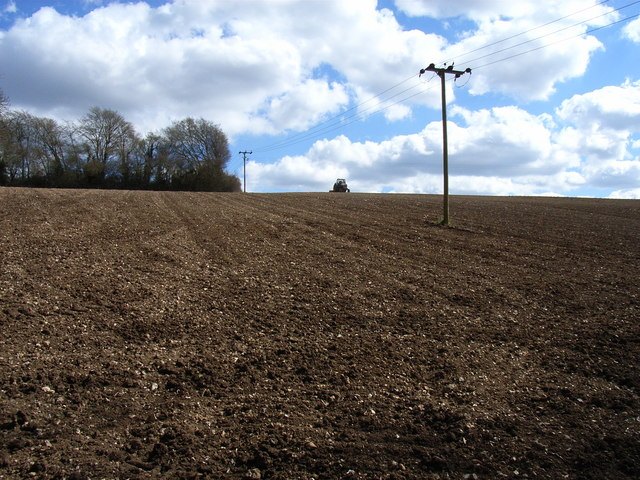
- Farmland at Beamond End

- Location within Buckinghamshire
- OS grid reference: SU91369678
- Unitary authority: Buckinghamshire
- Ceremonial county: Buckinghamshire
- Region: South East
- Country: England
- Sovereign state: United Kingdom
- Post town: Amersham
- Postcode district: HP7
- Police: Thames Valley
- Fire: Buckinghamshire
- Ambulance: South Central

Beamond End is a small hamlet in the parish of Little Missenden (where the 2011 Census was included), in Buckinghamshire, England.

The name is derived from the old French beau mont meaning "beautiful hill".

The hamlet comprises a single road (called "Beamond End Lane"), around 25 residential properties, as well as a number of light industrial units and farm buildings. Whereas it was once possible to drive through to the nearby village Little Missenden, the road was closed off to through vehicular traffic in the early 2010s, and is now only directly accessible on foot or by cycle.
