= Pond Park =

Area of Chesham, Buckinghamshire, England

Coordinates: 51.719°N 0.613°W

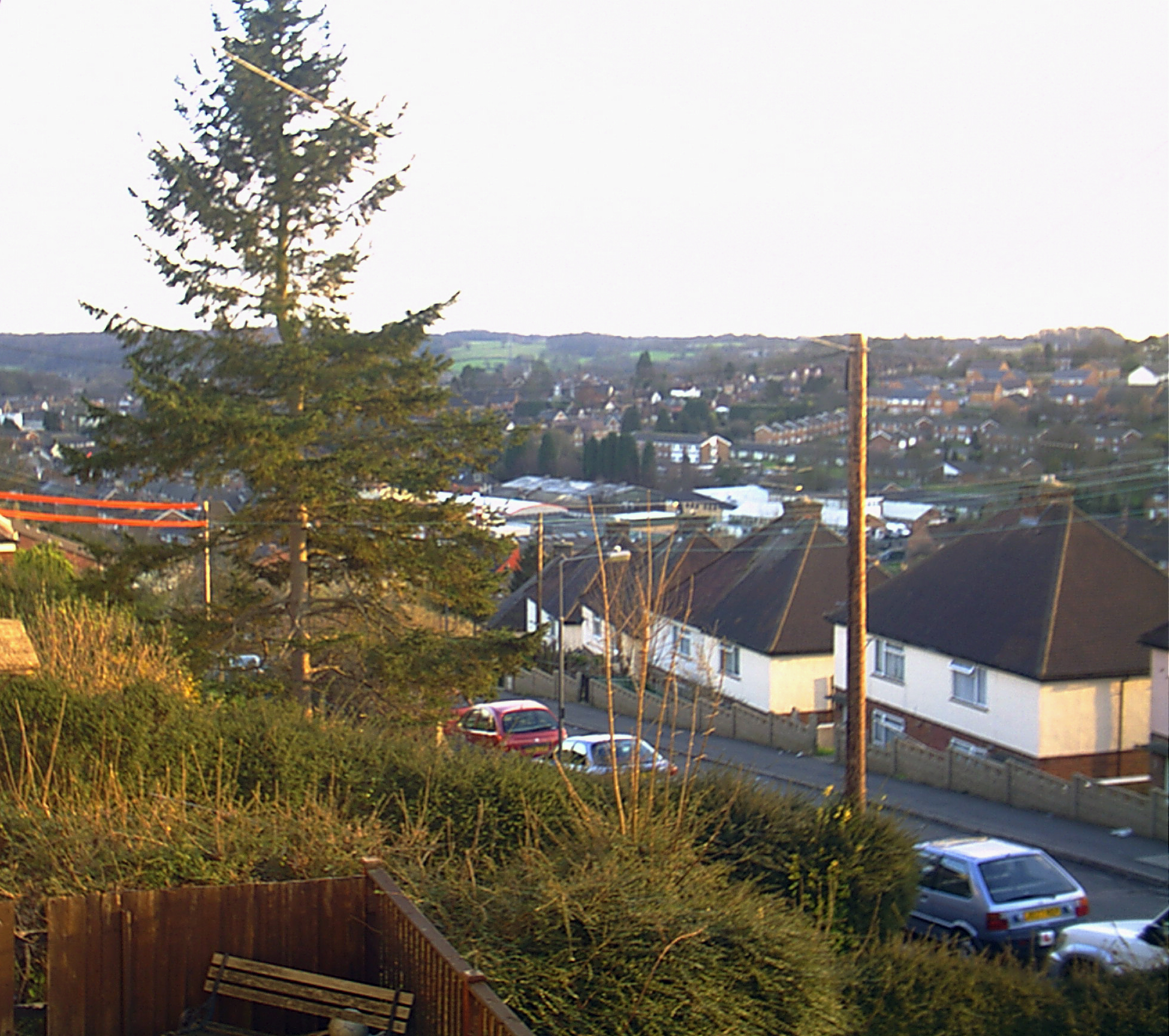
Looking over Chesham from Milton Road (on the hill), part of Pond Park

Pond Park (originally called North Chesham) is an area of Chesham in Buckinghamshire, England, built on the hills to the north of the town starting in 1891.

== Churches ==
The first nonconformist congregation in Pond Park met at Friendship Hall from 1936 and was a branch of the Congregational Church in Chesham. Then services were held at the Pond Park Community Hall (where the Belmont Club now meets) until 1962. It was run ecumenically by the Congregational, Methodist and Baptist churches of Chesham. THivings Free Church was built in 1962, and the new sanctuary in 1971. Today it is called Hope Church.

An Anglican congregation also met at William Durrant's School from 1961 to about 1978 (The school closed in 2002).

== Recreation Grounds ==
Pond Park has a number of recreation grounds, and a small parade of shops. Little Spring Primary School, based in the area, was formed in September 2002 from an amalgamation of Greenway Infant School and the William Durrant School (formerly an 8–12 school). The school has approximately 200 pupils aged between 4 and 11 years. The school was named after William J Durrant of Chesham who died in 1954.
