= Nash Lee =

Hamlet in Buckinghamshire, England

Coordinates: 51.767°N 0.782°W

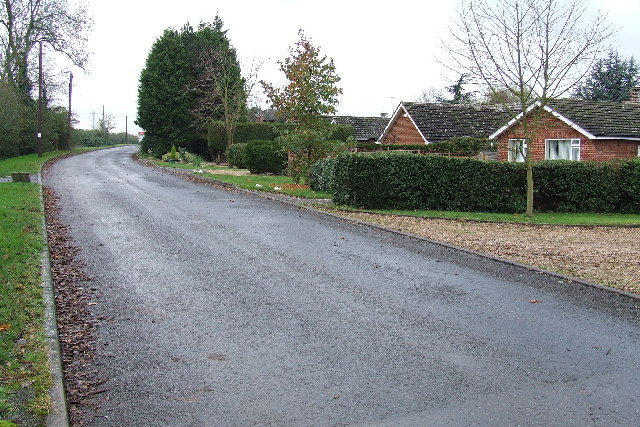
Bungalows in Nash Lee Lane, 2005

Nash Lee is a hamlet in the parish of Wendover, in Buckinghamshire, England. It is located to the north of the village, about two miles west of Wendover.

The hamlet name is Anglo Saxon in origin, and means 'clearing among the ash trees'. It was referred to in 12th century manorial records as Escelee.

Today little remains of Nash Lee apart from a farm and some houses. The feel of the hamlet was altered greatly in the construction of the nearby Wendover Bypass and the rerouting of adjacent roads to accommodate the new construction. All that marks Nash Lee today is the road name Nash Lee Lane.
