= Forty Green, Marlow =

Coordinates: 51.571704°N 0.792587°W

Forty Green
- Location within Buckinghamshire
- OS grid reference: SU8386
- Civil parish: Marlow
- Unitary authority: Buckinghamshire
- Ceremonial county: Buckinghamshire
- Region: South East
- Country: England
- Sovereign state: United Kingdom
- Post town: MARLOW
- Postcode district: SL7
- Dialling code: 01628
- Police: Thames Valley
- Fire: Buckinghamshire
- Ambulance: South Central
- UK Parliament: Wycombe

Forty Green is a small, mainly undeveloped, agricultural area on the west side of Marlow in Buckinghamshire, England. It comprises field parcel numbers 883, 892, 895, 896 and 838 on the civil parish Ordnance Survey map. Its boundaries are not marked with signposts but parcel 892 has an entrance from a residential street carrying the name, Forty Green Drive. At the 2011 Census the population of the area was included in the civil parish of Great Marlow.

As a result of efforts of residents living close to the fields, collaborating under the name Forty Green Preservation Society (formed in 1984 and still active) Forty Green, previously designated an Area of Attractive Landscape, has been reclassified as green belt with designated use as agricultural land. Some of the agricultural land has been bought with a view to selling it in small plots for residential development under the title King's Estate. In response to this Wycombe District Council has put up signs stating "WARNING - this land is not considered appropriate for residential development". Wycombe District Council has also made an Article Four Direction (which removes some permitted development rights) on the land North of Bovingdon Heights, Marlow. This means that fences, walls and other means of enclosures cannot be erected on the land nor can the land be used for any purpose other than agriculture.
