= Waldridge, Buckinghamshire =

Village in Buckinghamshire, England

Coordinates: 51.7584°N 0.8682°W

Waldridge is an ancient village in the civil parish of Dinton-with-Ford and Upton in Buckinghamshire, England. Although little of the original village survives today, the Waldridge Manor in the nearby village of Meadle shows the approximate location of the original settlement of Waldridge Village.

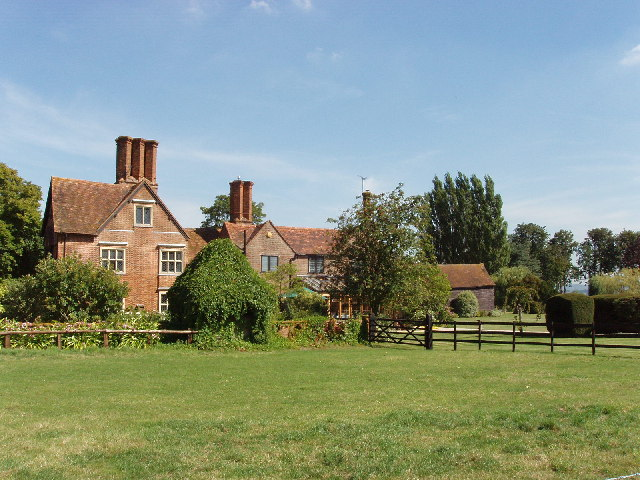
Waldridge Manor
