= Spurlands End =

Hamlet in Buckinghamshire, England

Coordinates: 51.670°N 0.709°W

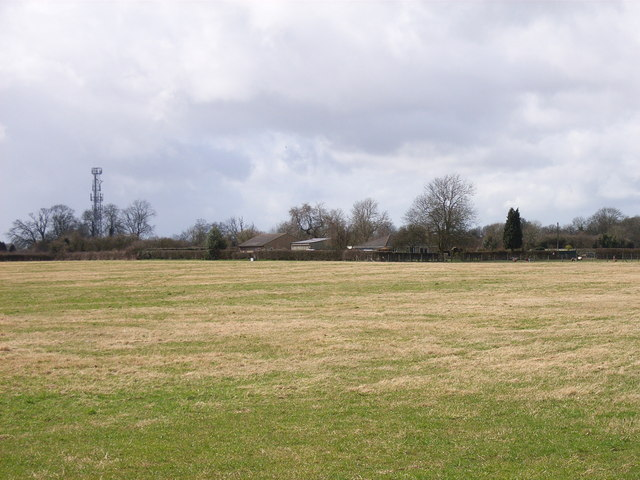
Spurlands End, 2006

Spurlands End is a hamlet in the parish of Little Missenden, in Buckinghamshire, England.

For most of its history, it consisted of just five neighbouring farms along Spurlands End Road - Wycombe Heath Farm, Bramble Farm, Spurlands End Farm, Nortons Farm, and Copes Farm. The hamlet used to lay in the Manor of Peterley (sometimes "Peterley Stone") which, for many years, was presided over by the Lords Dormer. A Victorian windmill was also once sited here.

The hamlet is thought to derive its name from the Sperling family who lived here in the medieval period. The 'End' element is derived from its position on the edge of the old Wycombe Heath (now vanished).

In modern times, Spurlands End has become closely associated with neighbouring Holmer Green.

Spurlands House was used for a few years in 1940s as a school-cum-home for about a dozen children.
