= Berryfields =

Major development area to the north-west of Aylesbury, Buckinghamshire, England

Coordinates: 51.841596°N 0.861966°W

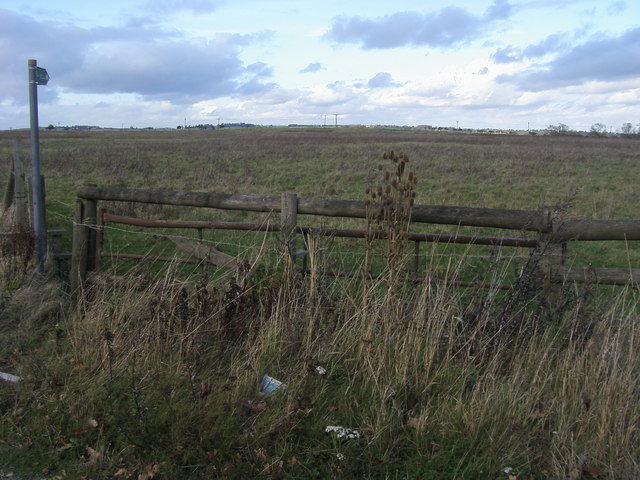
- Footpath to Hardwick by Berryfield House

- Location within Buckinghamshire
- Population: 5,000
- OS grid reference: SP7816
- Civil parish: Berryfields
- Unitary authority: Buckinghamshire
- Ceremonial county: Buckinghamshire
- Region: South East
- Country: England
- Sovereign state: United Kingdom
- Post town: AYLESBURY
- Postcode district: HP18
- Dialling code: 01296
- Police: Thames Valley
- Fire: Buckinghamshire
- Ambulance: South Central
- UK Parliament: Mid Buckinghamshire
- Website: Berryfields Parish Council

Berryfields is a Major Development Area (MDA) to the north-west of Aylesbury, Buckinghamshire, England. It is one of two new major housing projects in Aylesbury, the other being Weedon Hill, adjacent and to the east. It is intended that these two areas will provide 5,000 new homes between them by 2021.

The housing development being built at Weedon Hill has formed its own civil parish of Buckingham Park and Berryfields has been a civil parish since 2015.

== Transport ==
A new railway station, Aylesbury Vale Parkway opened on 14 December 2008, ready to serve the new housing. The Western Link Road, connecting the A41 and the A418, was originally scheduled to open in March 2009; it eventually opened in 2014.

A Redline bus service connects Berryfields to Aylesbury town centre.
