= Bierton =

Village in Buckinghamshire, England

Coordinates: 51.830°N 0.788°W

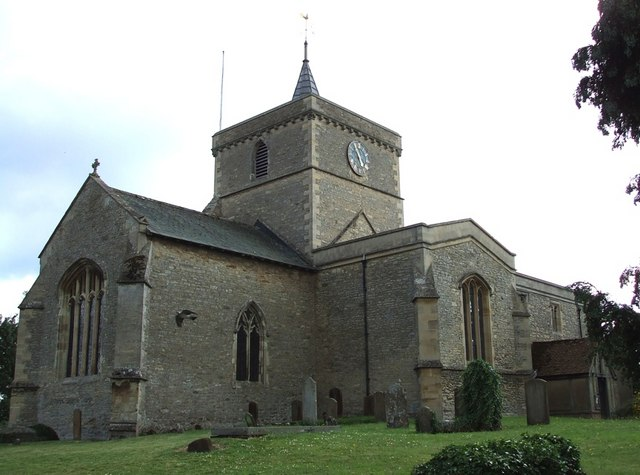
- Parish church of St James the Great

- Location within Buckinghamshire
- Population: 2,178 (2011 Census.civil parish including Hulcott)
- OS grid reference: SP8315
- Civil parish: Bierton
- Unitary authority: Buckinghamshire
- Ceremonial county: Buckinghamshire
- Region: South East
- Country: England
- Sovereign state: United Kingdom
- Post town: Aylesbury
- Postcode district: HP22
- Dialling code: 01296
- Police: Thames Valley
- Fire: Buckinghamshire
- Ambulance: South Central
- UK Parliament: Aylesbury

Bierton is a village and civil parish in Buckinghamshire, England, about half a mile northeast of the town of Aylesbury. It is a mainly farming parish. Together with the hamlets of Broughton, Kingsbrook, Broughton Crossing and Burcott it historically formed the civil parish of Bierton with Broughton in the Aylesbury Urban Area, but in 2020 the parish was broken into three, with Bierton becoming its own parish.

== History ==
A substantial Belgic settlement once occupied the site of the village with an extensive ditched enclosure. Excavations in 1979 detected four phases of occupation. The ditches were deliberately filled in the first century and little is visible today.

The village name was first recorded in the Domesday Book of 1086 as Bortone and means "farmstead near a stronghold" in modern English. The development of Bierton as a village was hampered by its being a linear settlement along the last road leading from Aylesbury to have its toll gate removed. The extra costs involved in travelling northwards using this route deterred many merchants, who favoured the less costly route via Winslow and Buckingham. The village remained an important point on this alternative northward route however, due to the presence of a wagon pond. This was used to swell the wooden axles of carts, and was a popular watering spot for carthorses.

The Church of England parish church of Saint James the Great is largely 14th century. At one time the village contained no fewer than seven public houses and porter houses. The stained glass door of the long since defunct "Star" can still be seen, as can that of the "Eagle" next door to the Jubilee Hall. The two remaining pubs are the historically significant Red Lion, and the Bell.

The Red Lion public house is a 16th-century inn, and was significant during the English Civil War. Bierton was a Royalist stronghold, opposed to its larger Parliamentarian neighbour of Aylesbury, and the Red Lion was host to many Cavalier Officers, and rumours have it to Charles I himself. A minor battle was fought northwest of the village towards Weedon.

== Chapels ==
Bierton had two non-conformist chapels – Methodist and Baptist – now both closed and converted to other use.

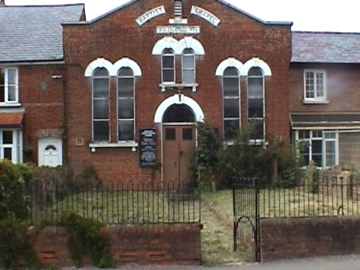
Bierton Baptist Chapel, 2005

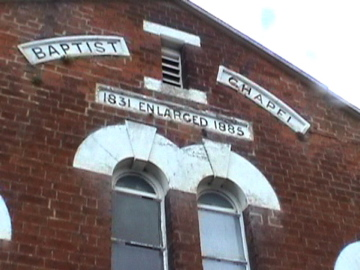
Indication of the dates of build and enlargement

A Baptist congregation was formed in Bierton and they met for worship at the chapel, originally called the school house, which was constructed in 1831 and enlarged in 1885. It was registered as a place of worship in 1864 as place for Baptists and Independents. The church became a Gospel Standard cause in 1981 and the last minister was sent to preach in the church in 1982. The chapel was closed for worship in 2002, after all the former members died, and it was eventually sold in 2006. The trust deeds were lodged with HM Land Registry and the property was later sold as a dwelling.

The Methodist chapel was on the corner of the road to Broughton. The building still has a graveyard behind it.

== Other activities ==
The major industry of the village in times past was brickmaking. Sitting on large sub-strata of Bierton Complex blue clay, the resource was mined for several centuries, and the bricks were fired close to the quarry. Brick Kiln lane exists to this day, although the workings themselves are no longer active.

The clay pits are now quiet pools, known as The Ponds. They have been turned into a private carp and tench fishery, whose fishing plots are highly sought after.

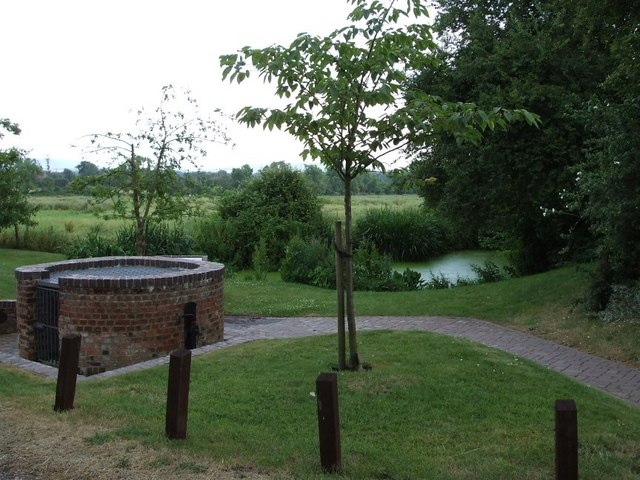
St Osyth's Well, Bierton

A well close to the church of St James the Great is dedicated to St Osyth, a local Anglo-Saxon princess born at Quarrendon Palace. She was reputedly beheaded in the woodland at St Osyth Priory by the Danes after having earlier drowned in a stream and been revived by nuns; it was said that a spring sprung up in nuns' wood within the grounds of St Osyth Priory that is still in existence today. It is not known why the well at Bierton is dedicated to the saint, only that ancient Bierton was on the route along which her body was taken from the priory to her final resting place; it is said that they made a stop-off at Bierton and laid her body down at the well's current location, which is why the well is dedicated to her.

== Present day ==
Today, with Aylesbury growing, the village is at risk of becoming a suburb of the larger town. All that separates them at present is a field of allotments about a hundred yards wide, owned by the Parish Council.

Bierton Church of England Combined School is a mixed voluntary controlled, Church of England primary school, which takes children between the ages of four and 11. The school has about 480 pupils.

Notable inhabitants of Bierton have included the author and poet May Sinclair (1863–1946), who lived at The Gables in Burcott Lane for the last ten years of her life. Carl Bilcock, former Bierton Village FC legend now plying his trade at Gamlingay United, has a strong association with the village. In earlier times the botanist and zoologist George Kearsley Shaw (1751–1813) was born in Bierton.

The nearest station to Bierton is Aylesbury, operated by Chiltern Railways. Buses that serve Bierton run between Aylesbury and Milton Keynes, operated by Arriva, and between Leighton Buzzard and Aylesbury run by Z&S International.
