= Buckingham Park, Buckinghamshire =

Area of Aylesbury, England

Coordinates: 51.835°N 0.819°W

Buckingham Park
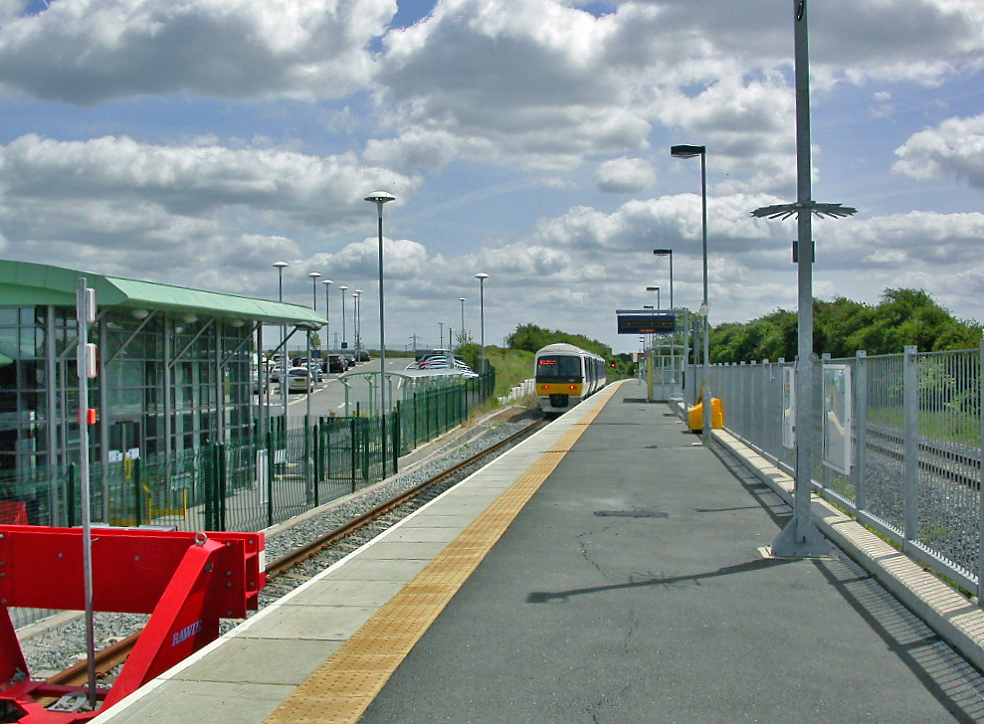
- Aylesbury Vale Parkway station SE view, 2011

- Location within Buckinghamshire
- Buckingham Park CP
- Population: 3,005 (2021 census)
- OS grid reference: SP8116
- Civil parish: Buckingham Park
- Unitary authority: Buckinghamshire
- Ceremonial county: Buckinghamshire
- Region: South East
- Country: England
- Sovereign state: United Kingdom
- Post town: AYLESBURY
- Postcode district: HP19
- Dialling code: 01296
- Police: Thames Valley
- Fire: Buckinghamshire
- Ambulance: South Central
- UK Parliament: Aylesbury

Buckingham Park is a civil parish that is a suburban residential neighbourhood on the north-west edge of Aylesbury, Buckinghamshire, England. It is the location of major housing developments on two sites known originally as 'Weedon Hill' and 'Berryfields'. The parish is immediately north of the River Thame.

== History ==
The development is to the north of Aylesbury, where the Battle of Aylesbury is reputed to have taken place in 1642. Because of this, special attention was paid to the area in the pre-construction archaeological excavation carried out in 2008, however only 24 musket shot were found. However, as the 247 bodies of the dead soldiers who had lain in that field were reburied in Hardwick in 1818, it is likely that any artefacts would have been reburied with them. Roads in the new estate have been named after figures from the battle, including Prince Rupert Drive and Colonel Grantham Avenue.

== Housing development ==
Building of the Weedon Hill housing development started in 2007. By 2025 1,035 houses, a community centre and a primary school had been completed. A retail development includes a Budgens supermarket, pharmacy, barber, beauty salon and a fish and chips shop.

== Transport ==
A new railway station, Aylesbury Vale Parkway opened on 14 December 2008, ready to serve the new housing developments. The first phase of the Western Link Road, a new link road, connecting the A41 and the A418 started construction in August 2013 and is now complete. Buckingham Park is also served by two bus routes.

== Governance ==
Buckingham Park parish was established in April 2011, including land formerly in Weedon Hill parish. Buckingham Park parish is within the Berryfields, Buckingham Park & Watermead ward of Buckinghamshire Unitary Authority.

== Education ==
Buckingham Park Church of England Primary School is located beside Buckingham Park Community Centre. It opened in September 2012 and was the first new school opened in Buckinghamshire in the 21st century.
