= A413 road =

Road in Buckinghamshire and Northamptonshire

Coordinates: 51.83554°N 0.81659°W

A413

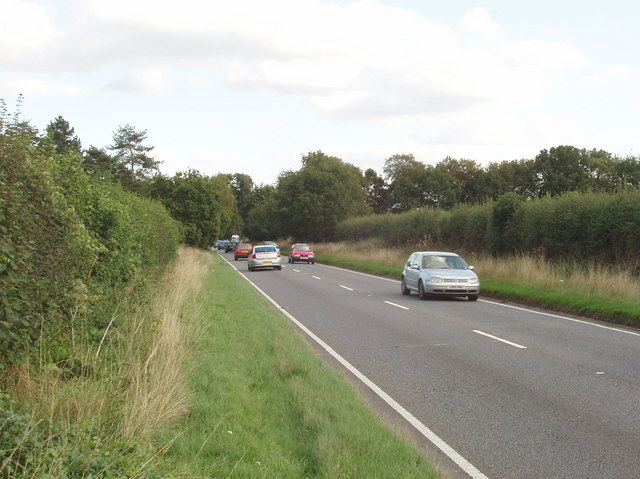
- A413 near Wendover

Major junctions
- South end: Denham, Buckinghamshire
- A40 A355 A404 A4010; A41 A418 A421; A43
- North end: Towcester

Location
- Country: United Kingdom
- Primary destinations: Aylesbury, Buckingham

Road network
- Roads in the United Kingdom; Motorways; A and B road zones
← A412	→ A414

The A413 is a major road in England that runs between Denham (west of London) to Towcester (northwest of Milton Keynes). It passes through or near various towns and villages including (in northbound order) Gerrards Cross, Chalfont St Peter, Chalfont St Giles, Amersham, Little Missenden, Great Missenden, Wendover, Aylesbury, Winslow, and Buckingham. Most of the road is in Buckinghamshire, with a part at the north end in Northamptonshire.

In the 1960s, a by-pass was built around Great Missenden and re-routing has taken place through Aylesbury town centre. In recent years, by-passes have been built for Amersham (1987) and Wendover (1998). In the early 21st century, the junction near Towcester where the A413 joins the A43 has also been redeveloped along with much-needed A43 redevelopment around Silverstone Circuit.

That part of the route which runs along the Misbourne Valley dates back into pre-history. In medieval times, the Cartulary of Missenden Abbey simply recorded the road as "the Kings Highway". Also just north of Aylesbury the road crosses Holman's Bridge, the location in 1642 of the Battle of Aylesbury.

The section of the A413 between Aylesbury and Winslow is known locally for its high accident rate. A number of signs have been put up along this stretch of road stating how many casualties have occurred on the road in recent years. The stretch has a high number of blind turnings, sudden speed limits and steep gradients. The worst accident to occur in recent years was in 2003 when a lorry crashed through the side of a bridge just south of the hamlet of Hardwick. The road was closed completely for two days resulting in all bus services being diverted onto the A418 or A41.

== In popular culture ==
Aylesbury rockstar John Otway wrote a B-Side about the road on his Number 9 hit single "Bunsen Burner." The song was called "A413 Revisited" and is about John returning home no longer as a one hit wonder but as a two hit artist. The chorus is:

"From Amersham, to Missenden,
to Wendover to the Vale of Aylesbury,
that's me heading down the 4-1-3"

and features places located on the road such as The Grange School in Aylesbury.
