= Latimer, Buckinghamshire =

Village in Buckinghamshire, England

Coordinates: 51.6796°N 0.5539°W

Latimer
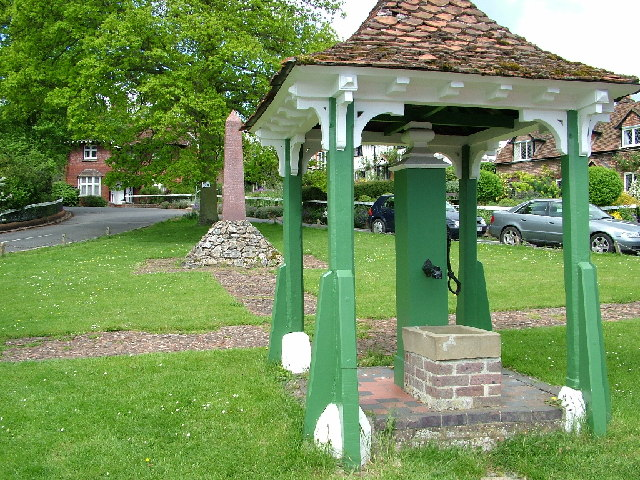
- Latimer, 2007

- Location within Buckinghamshire
- Population: 977 (2011 census)
- OS grid reference: TQ000988
- Civil parish: Latimer and Ley Hill
- Unitary authority: Buckinghamshire
- Ceremonial county: Buckinghamshire
- Region: South East
- Country: England
- Sovereign state: United Kingdom
- Post town: CHESHAM
- Postcode district: HP5
- Dialling code: 01494
- Police: Thames Valley
- Fire: Buckinghamshire
- Ambulance: South Central
- UK Parliament: Chesham and Amersham

Latimer is a village in Buckinghamshire, England, on the border with Hertfordshire. It is within the civil parish of Latimer and Ley Hill (known as simply Latimer until 2013), which also includes the village of Ley Hill and the hamlet of Tyler's Hill.

== History ==
Latimer was originally joined with the adjacent village of Chenies. Both were anciently called Isenhampstead, at a time when there was a royal palace in the vicinity. However, in the reign of King Edward III of England the lands were split between two manorial barons: Thomas Cheyne in the village that later became known as 'Chenies', and William Latimer in this village. Latimer came into possession of the manor in 1326.

At the time of the English Civil War Latimer belonged to the Earl of Devonshire. When Charles I was captured by the Parliamentarian forces he was brought to Latimer on his way to London.

The triangular village green has two memorials. The first is a memorial to men who fought and died during the Boer War in South Africa. The base consists of local pudding-stones with the names of the 132 men inscribed on an obelisk of granite. It was officially unveiled by Lady Chesham on 4 July 1903. The second memorial is to a horse called Villebois; a black charger that Lord Chesham brought back from South Africa. It died in February 1911 and a cairn of local pudding-stones was erected in its memory in June 1912.

== Buildings ==
Latimer House is an historic country house, the former home of Lord Chesham. It was used in the Second World War for interrogating German defectors and prisoners. It is now De Vere Latimer Estate, owned by De Vere hotels.

The small village includes 17th- and 18th-century cottages around the triangular village green with a pump on it. The church of St Mary Magdelane was rebuilt by Sir George Gilbert Scott in 1867. The rectory was built in the 18th century in grey and red brick.

In Ley Hill there is a common and a Methodist Chapel. Tyler's Hill is also in Latimer & Ley Hill parish and includes St George's Anglican Church. The graveyard at Tyler's Hill which serves Ley Hill and Tyler's Hill is run by Latimer and Ley Hill parish council.

== Railway ==
Chalfont & Latimer station is situated in nearby Little Chalfont on the Chiltern Line with London Underground services between Baker Street and Amersham, and Chiltern services to Aylesbury and Marylebone.

== Cultural references ==
Latimer was the location used in the Department S episode, "The Pied Piper of Hambledown", first aired on 30 September 1969.

The village green also features in an episode of the original Randall and Hopkirk (Deceased) TV series, and in an episode of Inspector Morse.
