= HP postcode area =

Postcode area within the United Kingdom

Hemel Hempstead
- Postcode area
- Location within the United Kingdom
- Coordinates: 51.723°N 0.688°W
- Sovereign state: United Kingdom
- Postcode area: HP
- Postcode area name: Hemel Hempstead
- Post towns: 11
- Postcode districts: 24
- Postcode sectors: 77
- Postcodes (live): 13,915
- Postcodes (total): 21,705
- Statistics as at May 2020

The HP postcode area, also known as the Hemel Hempstead postcode area, is a group of twenty-four postcode districts in England, within eleven post towns. These cover south-west Hertfordshire (including Hemel Hempstead, Berkhamsted and Tring) and central Buckinghamshire (including Aylesbury, High Wycombe, Beaconsfield, Amersham, Chalfont St Giles, Chesham, Great Missenden and Princes Risborough).

Mail for this area is sorted at the Home Counties North Mail Centre in Hemel Hempstead.

== Coverage ==
The approximate coverage of the postcode districts:

Postcode district	Post town	Coverage	Local authority area(s)
HP1	HEMEL HEMPSTEAD	Bourne End, Boxmoor, Chaulden, Fields End, Gadebridge, Great Gaddesden, Nettleden, Piccotts End, Water End, Warner's End	Dacorum
HP2	HEMEL HEMPSTEAD	Gaddesden Row, (Note: includes HP2 6FB) Piccotts End, Grovehill, Adeyfield, Hemel Hempstead Industrial Estate (Note: includes HP2 4NW)	Dacorum
HP3	HEMEL HEMPSTEAD	Apsley, Bovingdon, Felden, Flaunden, Hemel Hempstead, Leverstock Green	Dacorum
HP4	BERKHAMSTED	Berkhamsted, Dagnall, Dudswell, Little Gaddesden, Northchurch, Potten End, Ringshall	Dacorum, Buckinghamshire
HP5	CHESHAM	Chesham, Ashley Green, Bellingdon, Botley, Chartridge, Hawridge, Latimer, Lye Green, Newtown, Waterside, Whelpley Hill	Buckinghamshire
HP6	AMERSHAM	Amersham (north), Chesham Bois, Hyde Heath, Little Chalfont (north)	Buckinghamshire
HP7	AMERSHAM	Amersham (south), Coleshill, Little Chalfont (west and centre), Little Missenden, Penn Street, Winchmore Hill	Buckinghamshire
HP8	CHALFONT ST. GILES	Chalfont St Giles, Little Chalfont (south)	Buckinghamshire
HP9	BEACONSFIELD	Beaconsfield, Forty Green, Holtspur, Jordans, Knotty Green, Seer Green	Buckinghamshire
HP10	HIGH WYCOMBE	High Wycombe, Flackwell Heath, Handy Cross, Hedsor, Loudwater, Penn, Tylers Green, Wooburn, Wooburn Green, Wooburn Moor	Buckinghamshire
HP11	HIGH WYCOMBE	Wycombe Marsh	Buckinghamshire
HP12	HIGH WYCOMBE	High Wycombe, Booker, Sands	Buckinghamshire
HP13	HIGH WYCOMBE	High Wycombe, Downley, Totteridge	Buckinghamshire
HP14	HIGH WYCOMBE	Beacon's Bottom, Bledlow Ridge, Bolter End, Bradenham, Cadmore End, Hughenden Valley, Ibstone, Lane End, Naphill, Northend, Stokenchurch, The City, Upper North Dean, West Wycombe	Buckinghamshire
HP15	HIGH WYCOMBE	Cryers Hill, Great Kingshill, Hazlemere, Holmer Green, Hughenden Valley	Buckinghamshire
HP16	GREAT MISSENDEN	Great Missenden, Ballinger, The Lee, Little Hampden, Little Kingshill, Prestwood, South Heath	Buckinghamshire
HP17	AYLESBURY	Aston Sandford, Bishopstone, Butler's Cross, Dinton, Dorton, Ellesborough, Ford, Great and Little Kimble, Kingsey, Haddenham, Meadle, Nash Lee, Stone, Upton, Westlington	Buckinghamshire
HP18	AYLESBURY	Ashendon, Berryfields, Boarstall, Brill, Chearsley, Chilton, Cuddington, Dorton, Easington, Edgcott, Grendon Underwood, Ickford, Kingswood, Long Crendon, Lower Winchendon, Ludgershall, Oakley, Shabbington, Upper Winchendon, Waddesdon, Westcott, Worminghall, Wotton Underwood	Buckinghamshire
HP19	AYLESBURY	Aylesbury, Berryfields, Buckingham Park, Fairford Leys, Prebendal Farm, Quarrendon, Watermead	Buckinghamshire
HP20	AYLESBURY	Aylesbury, Aylesbury Town Centre, Broughton, Elmhurst	Buckinghamshire
HP21	AYLESBURY	Aylesbury, Bedgrove, Elm Farm, Queens Park, Southcourt, Walton, Walton Court	Buckinghamshire
HP22	AYLESBURY	Aston Abbotts, Aston Clinton, Bierton, Buckland, Drayton Beauchamp, Dunsmore, Halton, Hardwick, Hulcott, North Lee, Nup End, Oving, Pitchcott, Quainton, Rowsham, Stoke Mandeville, Weedon, Wendover, Weston Turville, Whitchurch, Wingrave	Buckinghamshire
HP22	PRINCES RISBOROUGH	—N/a	non-geographic
HP23	TRING	Aldbury, Buckland Common, Cholesbury, Hastoe, Long Marston, Marsworth, New Mill, Puttenham, St Leonards, Tring, Wigginton, Wilstone	Dacorum, Buckinghamshire
HP27	PRINCES RISBOROUGH	Askett, Bledlow, Ilmer, Lacey Green, Longwick, Loosley Row, Monks Risborough, Owlswick, Pitch Green, Princes Risborough, Saunderton, Speen	Buckinghamshire

== Map ==
HP postcode area map, showing postcode districts in red and post towns in grey text, with links to nearby AL, LU, MK, OX, RG, SL, UB and WD postcode areas.

== See also ==
- Postcode Address File
- List of postcode areas in the United Kingdom
