= Botley =

Botley is the name of several places in the United Kingdom:

- Botley, Buckinghamshire
- Botley, Hampshire
- Botley, Oxfordshire

== See also ==
- Botley the Robot, a fictional robot featured in Knowledge Adventure's JumpStart Adventures 3rd Grade: Mystery Mountain
