= Broughton Crossing =

Coordinates: 51.82373°N 0.78406°W

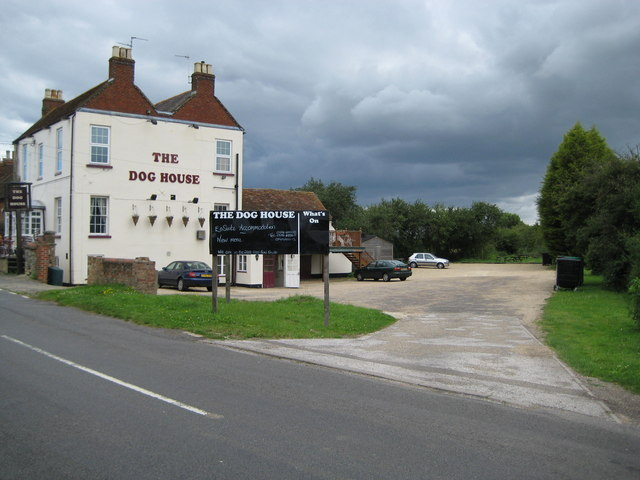
Broughton Crossing, The Dog House, 2008

Broughton Crossing is a hamlet / small settlement located between the Buckinghamshire villages of Bierton and Broughton in England. It is in the civil parish of Bierton with Broughton.

It takes its name from a long-vanished level crossing where the road crossed the now-defunct Cheddington to Aylesbury Line a branch line connecting the West Coast Main Line at Cheddington and Aylesbury. It consists of a public house and a few private houses, the easterly part of the former railway has been made into a road. It is a distinct settlement separated from Broughton itself by the Aylesbury Arm of the Grand Union Canal.

There is an urban myth that there was once a railway station or halt there.
