= Holman's Bridge =

Bridge in Buckinghamshire, England

Coordinates: 51°49′47.9″N 0°48′53.0″W

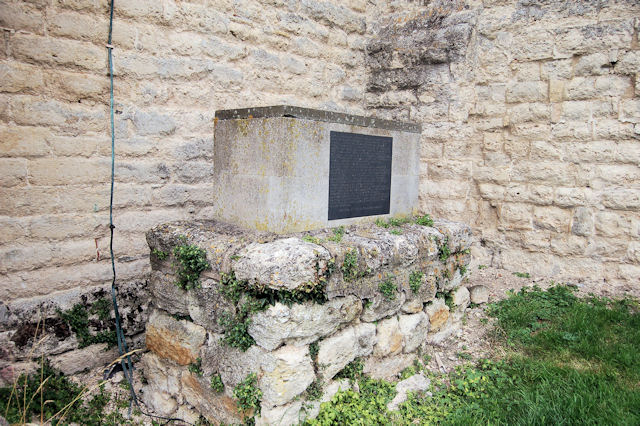
'Within are deposited the bones of 247 persons, who were discovered in AD 1818 buried in a field at Holman's Bridge near Aylesbury. From the history and appearance of the place where they were found it is concluded to be the remains of the officers and men who perished in an engagement fought in AD 1642 fought between the troops of K Charles I under the command of Prince Rupert and the garrison who held Aylesbury for the Parliament.'

Holman's Bridge is a brick-built bridge on the A413 to the north of Aylesbury in Buckinghamshire, England. It is where the A413 road crosses the River Thame. Aylesbury's first Charter of Incorporation in 1554 marked Holman's Bridge as the northernmost boundary of the town.

== History ==
It was the location, in 1642, of the Battle of Aylesbury, where although heavily outnumbered a Parliamentarian garrison under Sir William Balfour took the town of Aylesbury from the Royalist forces of Prince Rupert. After the battle the bodies of the dead were thrown into a common grave near the bridge. In 1818 they were exhumed and their bones moved to a common grave in nearby Hardwick.

In 2006 work began to add a wooden pedestrian bridge alongside the existing bridge to provide pedestrian access to the new Weedon Hill housing estate. The housing development is controversially being built on the tract of land where the battle took place.
