= Latimer and Ley Hill =

Civil parish in Buckinghamshire, England

Coordinates: 51.6993°N 0.565°W

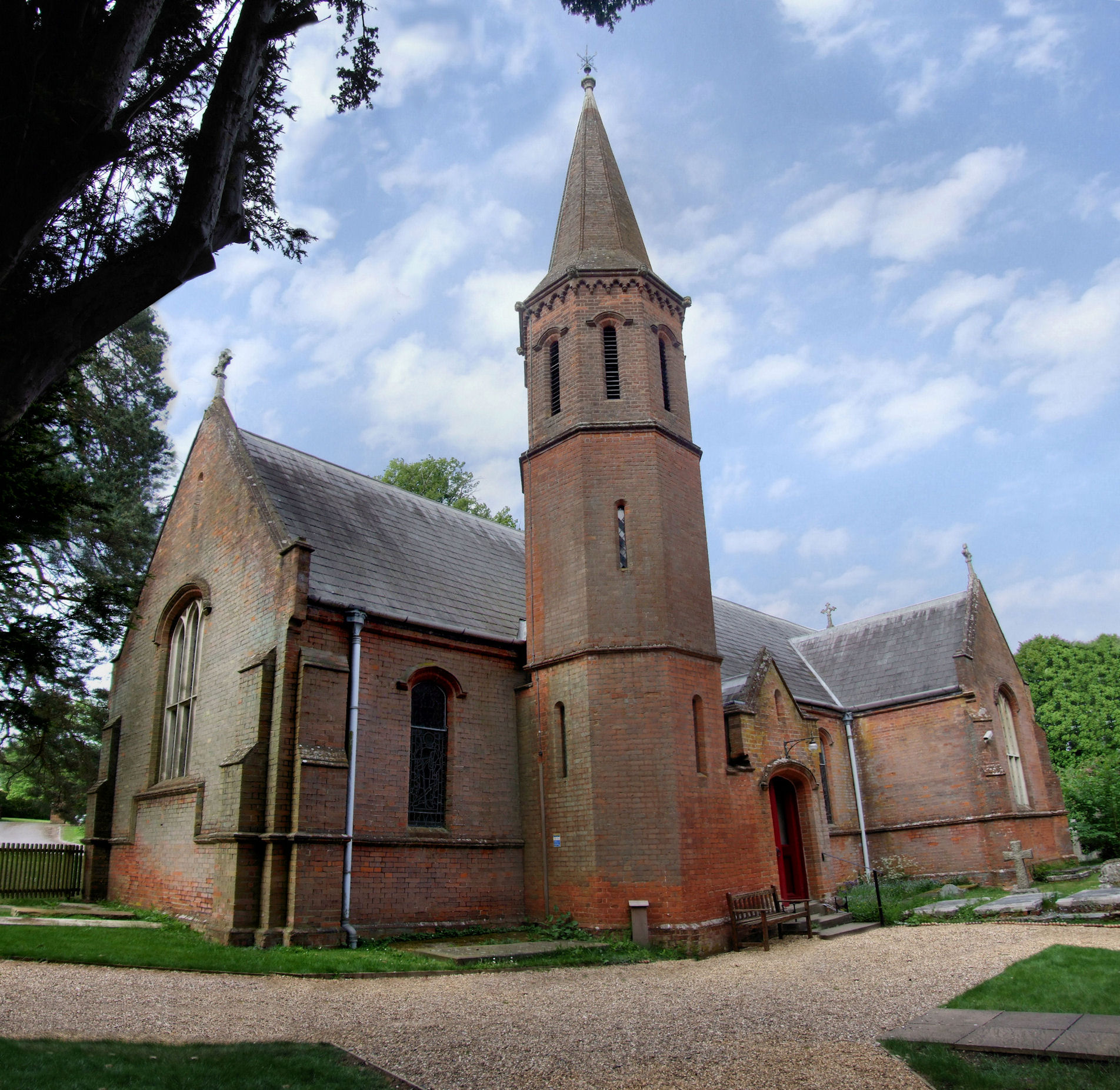

- Location within Buckinghamshire
- Population: 986 (2020)
- Civil parish: Latimer and Ley Hill
- Unitary authority: Buckinghamshire
- Ceremonial county: Buckinghamshire
- Region: South East
- Country: England
- Sovereign state: United Kingdom
- Post town: Chesham
- Postcode district: HP5
- Police: Thames Valley
- Fire: Buckinghamshire
- Ambulance: South Central

Latimer and Ley Hill, formerly just Latimer, is a civil parish under Buckinghamshire Council, in the ceremonial county of Buckinghamshire, England. The parish includes Latimer, Ley Hill and Tyler's Hill. As of 2020, it has a population of 986. Until 2020 it was in the Chiltern district.

== History ==
The parish was renamed from "Latimer" to "Latimer and Ley Hill" on 9 April 2013. The parish council was also renamed from "Latimer Parish Council" to "Latimer and Ley Hill Parish Council" at the same time. It was felt that the name better reflected the area since Ley Hill ward accounted for 65% of the electors.
