= Bessie Bangay =

Anglican Bishop's messenger

- Born: 29 June 1889; Lyme Regis, Dorset, England
- Died: 25 March 1987 (aged 97); Chesham, Buckinghamshire, England
- Occupation: Church worker

Bessie Dorrington Bangay (29 June 1889 – 25 March 1987) was an English church worker. At the time of her death, she was the last of the original cohort of Bishop's messengers in the Church of England, licensed during World War I.

== Early life ==
Bangay was born in 1889 in Lyme Regis, Dorset, the daughter of Richard Bangay and Agnes Dorrington Bangay. She had a twin sister, Evelyn, and four older siblings. Her parents were from Norfolk; her father was a doctor and a socialist, who gave popular science lectures and built an observatory on his property.

== Career ==
Bangay and her twin sister moved to Chesham, Buckinghamshire in 1910, and Bessie started to teach Sunday school at St George's Church, Tyler's Hill, Ley Hill. In 1917, during a wartime shortage of male church leaders, she was licensed by the Bishop of Oxford, as one of 22 women who began the Diocesan Order of Women's Messengers, female lay readers in the Church of England. She led St George's Church during the war, and afterwards. She also began a branch congregation at a pub in nearby Lye Green in the 1930s, and continued to run the "pub church" until 1963.

Bangay founded the Ley Hill Women's Institute, and was a member of the Chiltern Arts Society. She attended the National School for Religious Drama in 1955.

== Death and legacy ==
Bangay died in 1987, aged 97 years. She and her sister left money to the church, used to establish meeting space known as "the Bangay Rooms".
