= Charles Sheldon (disambiguation) =

Charles Sheldon may also refer to:

- Charles Mills Sheldon (1866–1928), US-born war correspondent and illustrator, who lived in London for most of his adult life
- Charles Sheldon (1857–1946), American minister, prohibitionist, and leader of the Social Gospel movement
- Charles Alexander Sheldon (1867–1928), American conservationist, "Father of Denali National Park"
- Charles H. Sheldon (1840–1898), second Governor of South Dakota
