= Ley Hill =

Village in Buckinghamshire, England

Coordinates: 51.700°N 0.565°W

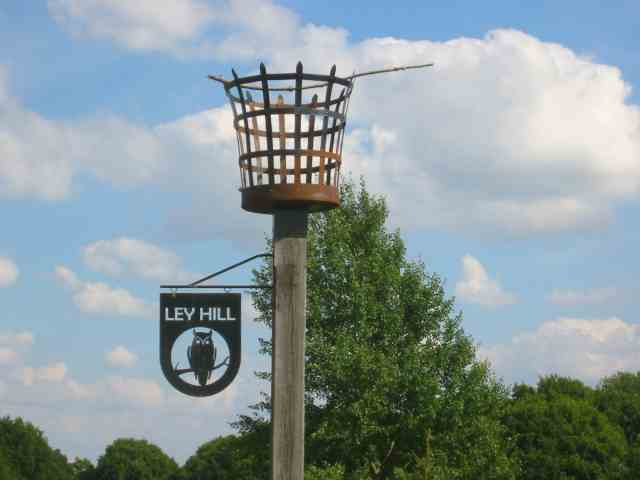
- Village sign and brazier

- Location within Buckinghamshire
- OS grid reference: SP9901
- East
- Civil parish: Latimer and Ley Hill
- Unitary authority: Buckinghamshire
- Ceremonial county: Buckinghamshire
- Region: South East
- Country: England
- Sovereign state: United Kingdom
- Post town: CHESHAM
- Postcode district: HP5
- Dialling code: 01494
- Police: Thames Valley
- Fire: Buckinghamshire
- Ambulance: South Central
- UK Parliament: Chesham & Amersham

Ley Hill is a Chiltern village on the Buckinghamshire/Hertfordshire border in south-east England, near the town of Chesham. It is part of the civil parish of Latimer and Ley Hill, and comes under Chiltern District Council in the County of Buckinghamshire. Ley Hill lies in the Chiltern Hills and is contiguous with Botley.

== The Common ==
The village has a large common, which is used by Chesham and Ley Hill Golf Club and Ley Hill Cricket Club. Golf has been played on the Common since about 1900. In 2000 a village sign was hung up on the Common which incorporates an owl as the unofficial village emblem.

== Pubs ==
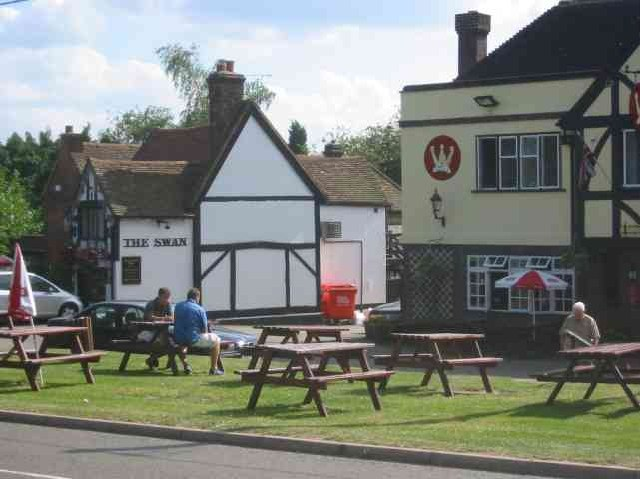
The Swan and The Crown

There are two pubs on the Common called The Swan and The Crown that both serve food.

The Swan was built in about 1520, and takes its name from the symbol of the county of Buckinghamshire. In 1680, the timber-framed building consisted of three cottages with five extensions, oak-beamed ceilings and pillars, a kitchen range and an inglenook fireplace. It is reputedly one of the oldest pubs in Buckinghamshire. During the Second World War, the 'snug' was used as a sub-post office. Clark Gable and James Stewart were frequent visitors during World War II, and signed photographs were displayed in the bar for many years. They cycled from Bovingdon airbase.

Further down Botley Road is also the Hen and Chickens pub. The former Five Bells pub in Tylers Hill has been closed for many years and has been converted into a private dwelling.

== Churches ==
The first church in Ley Hill was the Baptist church which dates back to meetings in 1786. The Chapel was built in 1833, as a branch of the Lower Baptist Church in Chesham (now Trinity Baptist), and it closed in 1908 when the people joined the Methodist church.

A Methodist society was first registered in February 1841 as part of the Primitive Methodist tradition and used to meet in local houses. It was started by the Rev Thomas Green from the Rickmansworth Mission, and has ever since been linked with Methodist churches in West Hertfordshire. The first chapel was built in 1846. The current chapel on the Green which was built in 1887 with 11 Trustees, and the land was given by Lord Chesham. Today the church has an evangelical congregation of all ages, with activities for young and old.

The village has an Anglican Church called St George's at Tyler's Hill which was built in 1871. The Bangay Rooms, named after Miss Bessie Bangay, an active member of the church from 1910 until her death in 1987, are the location of the local Brownie meetings. Miss Bessie Bangay was one of the first female Anglican lay readers in England (called Bishop's Messengers). When she was licensed in 1917, she used to run a branch of the church at the Black Cat pub in Lye Green.

== School ==
In the Victorian era most people around Latimer and Ley Hill worked for the Cavendish family of Latimer House. Mrs Catherine Cavendish (from 1858 called Lady Chesham) arranged for schools to be built at Latimer, Flaunden and Ley Hill. The school at Ley Hill was built at the back of the Common in 1847, using local brick and knapped flint. The schools were known as “Lady Chesham’s Schools”. The first schoolhouse in Ley Hill was built in 1847 for local girls, and Latimer School was for boys. Boys were admitted to Ley Hill School from 1888. This former school was behind the Common and in the building called "The Old Schoolhouse", in School Lane.

The current school building was built in 1927. Ley Hill School is a primary school for boys and girls up to the age of eleven when they take the 11+ examination.

== Sport ==
Most of the village common is used as a 9-hole golf course by Chesham & Ley Hill Golf Club. The common was given over to golf by Lord Chesham in 1900.

Ley Hill Cricket Club is a village-standard club competing in the Mid Bucks League. The club has four senior sides, as well as junior sides from Under 9s upwards. In 2006 the club became the first in Buckinghamshire to receive Clubmark accreditation.

== Local industries ==
Local industries include agriculture and brick-making. Historically the village also had tile making and pottery, which are remembered in the local names of Tyler's Hill and Kiln Lane. In the mid-1980s an extensive late medieval tile kiln (approx 1400) was found while excavating an extension in Joiners Close. Dunton's brickworks manufactured bricks until 2013.
