= Kingsbrook =

Kingsbrook may refer to:

- Kingsbrook, Bedford, an area of Bedford in Bedfordshire, England
- Kingsbrook, Buckinghamshire, a village near Aylesbury in Buckinghamshire, England
- Kingsbrook Jewish Medical Center, a hospital in New York, United States
