= Frederick Sadleir Brereton =

Lieutenant-Colonel Frederick Sadleir Brereton, CBE (5 August 1872 – 12 August 1957) who often wrote under the name Captain Brereton, was a British Army medical officer and an author of children's books on heroic deeds conducted in the name of the British Empire.

== Early career ==
Brereton was commissioned into the Royal Army Medical Corps (RAMC) as a surgeon-lieutenant on 29 January 1896, and was promoted to captain on 29 January 1899. During the Second Boer War he was attached as a medical officer to the Scots Guards. He retired his commission on 22 November 1902, after the end of the war in South Africa.

== First World War ==
Brereton served again in the RAMC during the First World War with the rank of Brevet Lieutenant Colonel. In 1919 he was appointed as a Commander of the Portuguese Order of Aviz and a CBE.

== Personal life ==
Brereton married Ethel Lamb in 1898 and Isobel Murdoch in 1953. He lived at Chaulden House in Chaulden but he then relocated to Heath Barn in Boxmoor in the 1920s.

== Bibliography ==
Title	Year	Publisher	Main character	Notes
With Shield and Assegai: A Tale of the Zulu War	1899	Blackie and Son		320 pages, Illustrations by Stanley L. Wood
With Rifle and Bayonet: A Story of the Boer War	1900	Blackie and Son		352 pages, Illustrations by Wal Paget
In the King's Service: Cromwell's Invasion of Ireland	1901	Blackie and Son		352 pages, Illustrations by Stanley L. Wood
A Gallant Grenadier: A Tale of the Crimean War	1901	Blackie and Son		352 pages, Illustrations by Wal Paget
Under the Spangled Banner: A Tale of the Spanish–American War	1902	Blackie and Son		352 pages, Illustrations by Paul Hardy
In the Grip of the Mullah: A Tale of Adventure in Somaliland	1903	Blackie and Son		347 pages, Illustrations by Charles M. Sheldon
One of the Fighting Scouts: A Tale of Guerilla Warfare in South Africa	1903	Blackie and Son		352 pages, Illustrations by Stanley L. Wood
A Hero of Lucknow: A Tale of the Indian Mutiny	1905	Blackie and Son		386 pages, Illustrations by W. Rainey
Indian and Scout: A Tale of Gold Rush to California	1905	Blackie and Son		368 pages, Illustrations by Cyrus Cuneo
A Soldier of Japan: A Tale of the Russo-Japanese War	1906	Blackie and Son		350 pages, Illustrations by Stanley L. Wood
A Knight of St. John: A Tale of the Siege of Malta	1906	Blackie and Son	Martin Trentall	384 pages, Illustrations by W. Rainey
Jones of the 64th. A Tale of the Battles of Assaye and Laswaree	1907	Blackie and Son		341 pages, Illustrations by W. Rainey
Roger the Bold: A Tale of the Conquest of Mexico	1907	Blackie and Son		381 pages, Illustrations by Stanley L. Wood
How Canada Was Won: A Tale of Wolfe and Quebec	1908	Blackie and Son		391 pages, Illustrations by W. Rainey
Roughriders of the Pampas: A Tale of Ranch Life in South America	1908	Blackie and Son		366 pages, Illustrations by Stanley L. Wood
With Wolseley to Kumasi: A Tale of the First Ashanti War	1908	Blackie and Son		373 pages, Illustrations by Gordon Browne
Hemel Hempstead Through the Ages	1910	Hertfordshire Newspapers Ltd.		72 pages
John Bargreave's Gold: A Tale of Adventures in the Caribbean	1910	Blackie and Son		356 pages, Illustrations by Charles M. Sheldon
The Great Aeroplane: A Thrilling Tale of Adventure	1911	Blackie and Son		396 pages, Illustrations by Edward S. Hodgson
The Hero of Panama: A Tale of the Great Canal	1912	Blackie and Son	Jim Partington	384 pages, Illustrations by William Rainey
Under the Chinese Dragon: A Tale of Mongolia	1912	Blackie and Son	David Harbor	363 pages, Illustrations by Charles M. Sheldon
A Boy of the Dominion: A Tale of Canadian Immigration	1913	Blackie and Son		367 pages, Illustrations by W. Rainey
King of Ranleigh: A School Story	1913	S. W. Partridge & Co.		416 pages, Illustrations by Ernest Prater
The Great Airship: A Tale of Adventure	1914	Blackie and Son	Dicky Hamshaw	360 pages, Illustrations by C. M. Padday
With the Dyaks of Borneo: A Tale of the Head Hunters	1914	Blackie and Son		383 pages, Illustrations by W. Rainey
With Wellington in Spain: A Story of the Peninsula	1914	Blackie and Son		384 pages, Illustrations by W. Rainey
Under French's Command: A Story of the Western Front from Neuve Chapelle to Loos	1915	Blackie and Son		336 pages, Illustrations by Archibald Webb
With Joffre at Verdun: A Story of the Western Front	1916	Blackie and Son		288 pages, Illustrations by Archibald Webb
With Our Russian Allies: A Tale of Cossack Fighting in the Eastern Campaign	1916	Blackie and Son		376 pages, Illustrations by Wal Paget
On the Road to Bagdad: A Story of the British Expeditionary Force in Mesopotamia	1917	Blackie and Son		384 pages, Illustrations by Wal Paget
Under Haig in Flanders: A Story of Vimy, Messines and Ypres	1917	Blackie and Son		286 pages, Illustrations J. E. Sutcliffe
The Armoured-Car Scouts: A Tale of the Campaign in the Caucasus	1918	Blackie and Son		384 pages, Illustrations by Archibald Webb
With Allenby in Palestine: A Story of the Latest Crusade	1920	Blackie and Son		287 pages, Illustrations by Frank Gillett
Scouts of the Baghdad Patrols	1921	Cassell and Company		303 pages, Illustrations by Stanley L. Wood
Clothing: An Account of its Types and Manufacture	1931	B. T. Batsford		88 pages
Travel: An Account of its Methods in Past and Present	1931	B. T. Batsford		88 pages
