= Easington, Buckinghamshire =

Hamlet in Buckinghamshire, England

Coordinates: 51.786°N 1.005°W

Easington
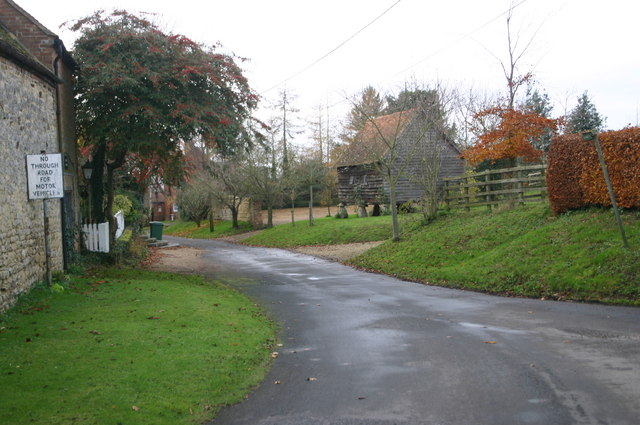
- Easington Lane, 2007

- Location within Buckinghamshire
- OS grid reference: SP6814
- Civil parish: Chilton
- Unitary authority: Buckinghamshire
- Ceremonial county: Buckinghamshire
- Region: South East
- Country: England
- Sovereign state: United Kingdom
- Post town: Aylesbury
- Postcode district: HP18
- Dialling code: 01844
- Police: Thames Valley
- Fire: Buckinghamshire
- Ambulance: South Central
- UK Parliament: Mid Buckinghamshire

Easington is a hamlet in the civil parish of Chilton, Buckinghamshire, about 3 miles (5 km) north of the Oxfordshire market town of Thame. The hamlet is between the villages of Chilton and Long Crendon and consists of around 30 houses.

The toponym is derived from Old English and evolved through Hesintone, Essintone and Easyngdon before reaching its present form.

== Manor ==
Before the Norman conquest of England Alric, son of Goding, a thegn of Edward the Confessor, held the manors of Chilton and Easington. However, the Domesday Book records that by 1086 the Norman baron Walter Giffard held the two manors. The Domesday Book assessed the manor of Easington at five hides.

From 1387 to 1523 the manor was part of the honour of Gloucester. In 1525 Easington reverted to the Crown, which granted the manor to John Croke of Chilton Manor, in whose family it seems to have stayed until at least 1657.

The will of John Hart, proved in 1665, left a rental income of £3 per annum from the manor of Easington to fund the apprenticeship of one poor boy. In the 1920s the bequest was still being applied "as occasion arises".

== Sources ==
- Page, W.H., ed. (1927). A History of the County of Buckingham, Volume 4. Victoria County History. pp. 22–27.
