= Warner's End =

Human settlement in United Kingdom

Coordinates: 51.757561°N 0.48927°W

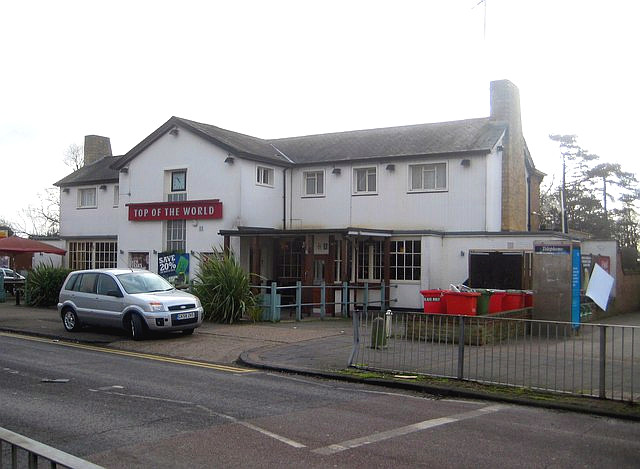
The Top of the World pub at Warners End was built shortly after the first ascent of Mount Everest and celebrates that achievement

Warners End is a neighbourhood or district of Hemel Hempstead, a new town in Hertfordshire, England. At the 2011 Census the population of the District was included in the Chaulden and Warner's End ward of Dacorum Council. It was the fourth of the new districts built during the expansion of Hemel Hempstead into a new town with work on its construction commencing in 1953.

The place name can be traced back to John Warner, who is mentioned in land documents from 1609. Warners End farm is notable on historic maps. Its site is now partly occupied by Fields End Junior School. Some of its buildings survive on Long Chaulden.

The country house, Northridge Park, was built in 1890, and was the home of Nathaniel Micklem QC, Liberal MP for the Watford division of Hertfordshire between 1906 and 1910. Its site is now occupied by William Crook House an old people's home.

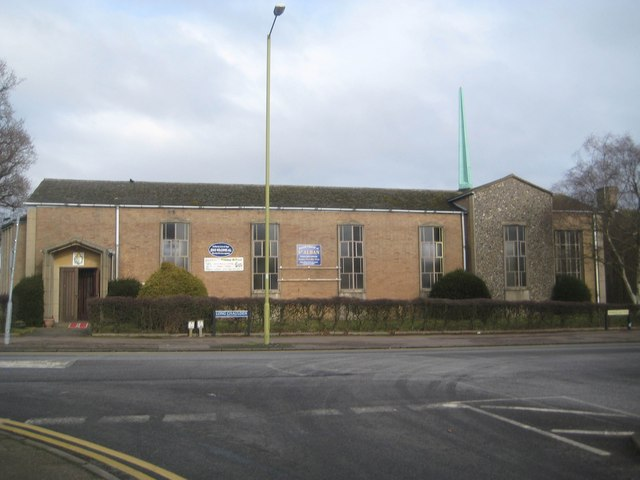
The Parish Church of St Alban, Warners End

Like other new town districts in Hemel Hempstead, Warners End has its community shopping parade called Stoneycroft. The pub, built by the New Town corporation in 1956, is called 'Top of the World' in honour of the conquering of Everest which took place shortly after building work was completed. The district itself was virtually complete by 1959.

Warners End lies north of the town, around the Stoneycroft shopping area. Boxted Road, which leads from Hemel Hempstead to Fields End and Potten End, passes through the neighbourhood. Local schools are Micklem and formerly Martindale primary schools (closed 2008), and the John F Kennedy Catholic School.

The neighbouring districts are Gadebridge and Chaulden.
