= Chilton, Buckinghamshire =

Village and civil parish in England

Coordinates: 51.798°N 1.008°W

Chilton
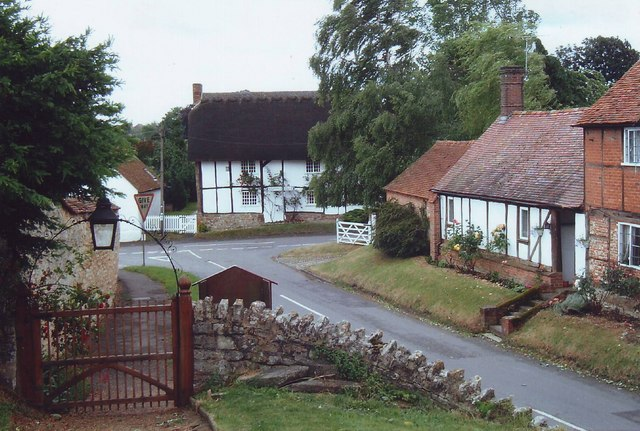
- Village cottages, Chilton, Bucks, 2004

- Location within Buckinghamshire
- Population: 302 (2011 Census)
- OS grid reference: SP6811
- Civil parish: Chilton
- Unitary authority: Buckinghamshire
- Ceremonial county: Buckinghamshire
- Region: South East
- Country: England
- Sovereign state: United Kingdom
- Post town: Aylesbury
- Postcode district: HP18
- Dialling code: 01844
- Police: Thames Valley
- Fire: Buckinghamshire
- Ambulance: South Central
- UK Parliament: Mid Buckinghamshire
- Website: Chilton Parish Council

Chilton is a village and civil parish in the Buckinghamshire district in Buckinghamshire, England. It is in the Aylesbury Vale area in the west of the county, about 4 miles (6.4 km) north of Thame in Oxfordshire. Chilton parish includes the hamlet of Easington (not to be confused with the Oxfordshire village of Easington).

== Manor ==
The toponym "Chilton" is derived from the Old English for "young man's farm". The Domesday Book of 1086 records it as Ciltone. It evolved via the forms Chiltone in the 12th century and Schelton in the 18th century before reaching its present form.

Before the Norman conquest of England Alric, son of Goding, a thegn of Edward the Confessor, held the manors of Chilton and Easington. However, the Domesday Book records that by 1086 the Norman baron Walter Giffard held the two manors.

Chilton House was built by John Croke in the early 17th century, then rebuilt by Richard Carter in the 1740s. Its design was based on that of Buckingham House. It is now in the ownership of the Aubrey-Fletcher family and operated as a residential care home.

== Parish church ==
The Church of England parish church of Saint Mary the Virgin was originally a 12th-century Norman building but few details survive from that period. The chancel and south transept are 13th century, the Decorated Gothic tower forms the north transept and is mid-14th century. The nave, chancel arch and chancel roof were renewed in the 15th century. The Perpendicular Gothic south chapel was added in about 1520.

== Sources ==
- Pevsner, Nikolaus (1973) [1966]. Buckinghamshire. The Buildings of England. Harmondsworth: Penguin Books. pp. 95–96. ISBN 0140710191.
- Reed, Michael (1979). Hoskins, W.G.; Millward, Roy (eds.). The Buckinghamshire Landscape. The Making of the English Landscape. London: Hodder & Stoughton. pp. 74, 138. ISBN 0-340-19044-2.
