= Broughton, Aylesbury =

Hamlet in Buckinghamshire, England

Coordinates: 51.816896°N 0.775106°W

Broughton
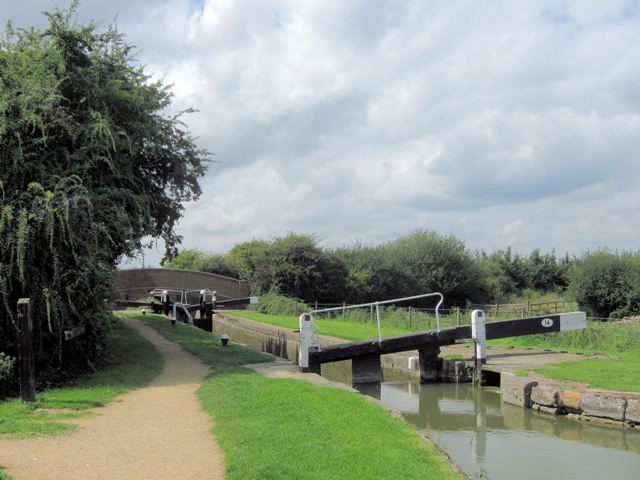
- Broughton lock, Aylesbury Arm of the Grand Union Canal

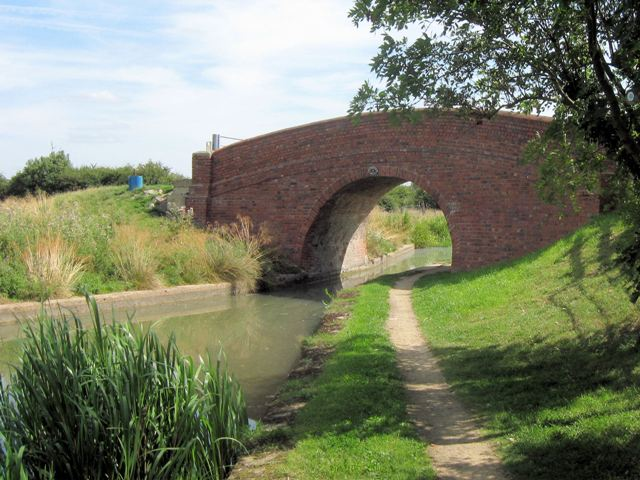
- Bridge No 13, Broughton, Aylesbury Arm of the Grand Union Canal

- Location within Buckinghamshire
- Population: 48
- OS grid reference: SP8413
- Civil parish: Broughton Hamlet
- Unitary authority: Buckinghamshire
- Ceremonial county: Buckinghamshire
- Region: South East
- Country: England
- Sovereign state: United Kingdom
- Post town: AYLESBURY
- Postcode district: HP20, HP22
- Dialling code: 01296
- Police: Thames Valley
- Fire: Buckinghamshire
- Ambulance: South Central
- UK Parliament: Aylesbury

Broughton /ˈbrɔːtən/ is a hamlet and civil parish to the east of Aylesbury in Buckinghamshire, England. Broughton is also the name of a nearby housing estate in Aylesbury itself.

Early recordings of Broughton are:
- the Domesday Book where it appears as "22 households (quite large)"
- as being part of the manor of Bierton in the late 13th century. The hamlet name is Anglo-Saxon and means farm by a brook. The brook in this case is the Bearbrook that rises near Bedgrove, flows through Broughton then back into Aylesbury before joining the River Thame near Quarrendon.

In the 1840s, a new branch railway was constructed linking Aylesbury to the Midlands that crossed the road that linked Broughton with Bierton. A public house and signalmen's cottages were constructed at the level crossing and the area became known as Broughton Crossing. Today, this is considered a separate hamlet from Broughton itself.

In 1870–72, John Marius Wilson described Bierton With Broughton like this: BIERTON-WITH-BROUGHTON, a parish in Aylesbury district, Bucks; on the Aylesbury railway, near the Aylesbury canal, 1½ mile NE of Aylesbury. It has a post office, of the name of Bierton, under Aylesbury. Acres, 2,470. Real property, £5,312. Pop., 691. Houses, 149. The property is divided among a few. The living is a vicarage, united with the vicarage of Quarrendon, in the diocese of Oxford. Value, £310.* Patrons, the Dean and Chapter of Lincoln. The church is a structure of the 12th century, with tower and spire; was recently well repaired; and contains a piscina, and a curious monument of 1616 to Samuel Pope and his thirteen children. There are chapels for Baptists and Methodists, a national school, and charities £40.

In the 1960s British housing boom, land that belonged to the parish of Bierton was sold to developers who constructed the housing estate of Broughton. Many local people immediately think of the estate when they hear the word 'Broughton,' as it is a very popular estate on which to live. This was one of several developments in Aylesbury. All that separates Broughton hamlet from Broughton estate today is the brook from which the hamlet first took its name.

Broughton is served by New Millside Pre-School for children aged from two to five, Broughton Infant School for children aged from four to seven, and Broughton Junior School for children aged from seven to eleven. Both schools are community schools, which each take approximately 180 pupils.

In the same building as the pre-school, there is the Sure Start Children's Centre which serves the Broughton and immediately surrounding areas.

The Anglican (Church of England) congregation was established in 1989. In August 2009 the Church Commissioners changed the parish boundaries in this part of Aylesbury, and the Broughton Church became a parish in its own right.

In July 2014 a community coffee shop called more^{+} was opened in Parton Road. It is operated by Broughton Community Action which is a Registered Charity. The aim is to provide a place where residents can meet and enhance community on the estate.

Arriva the Shires & Essex 'Pink Route' 8 to Aylesbury bus station serves Broughton housing estate Monday-Saturday, at a frequency of up to every 20 minutes. The service runs via the nearby housing estate of Bedgrove.

== Civil parish ==
Historically Broughton formed part of the civil parish of Bierton with Broughton with Bierton and other neighbouring hamlets. The development of the new village of Kingsbrook and the subsequent desire for a new parish council there to be separated from that of Bierton. As this proposal would result in the land around Broughton to the south of Kingsbrook becoming separated from Bierton, it was decided to divide the parish of Bierton with Broughton into three, and the new parish of Broughton Hamlet came into existence on 7 May 2020.
