= Felden =

Area of Hemel Hempstead, Hertfordshire, England

Coordinates: 51.73°N 00.46°W

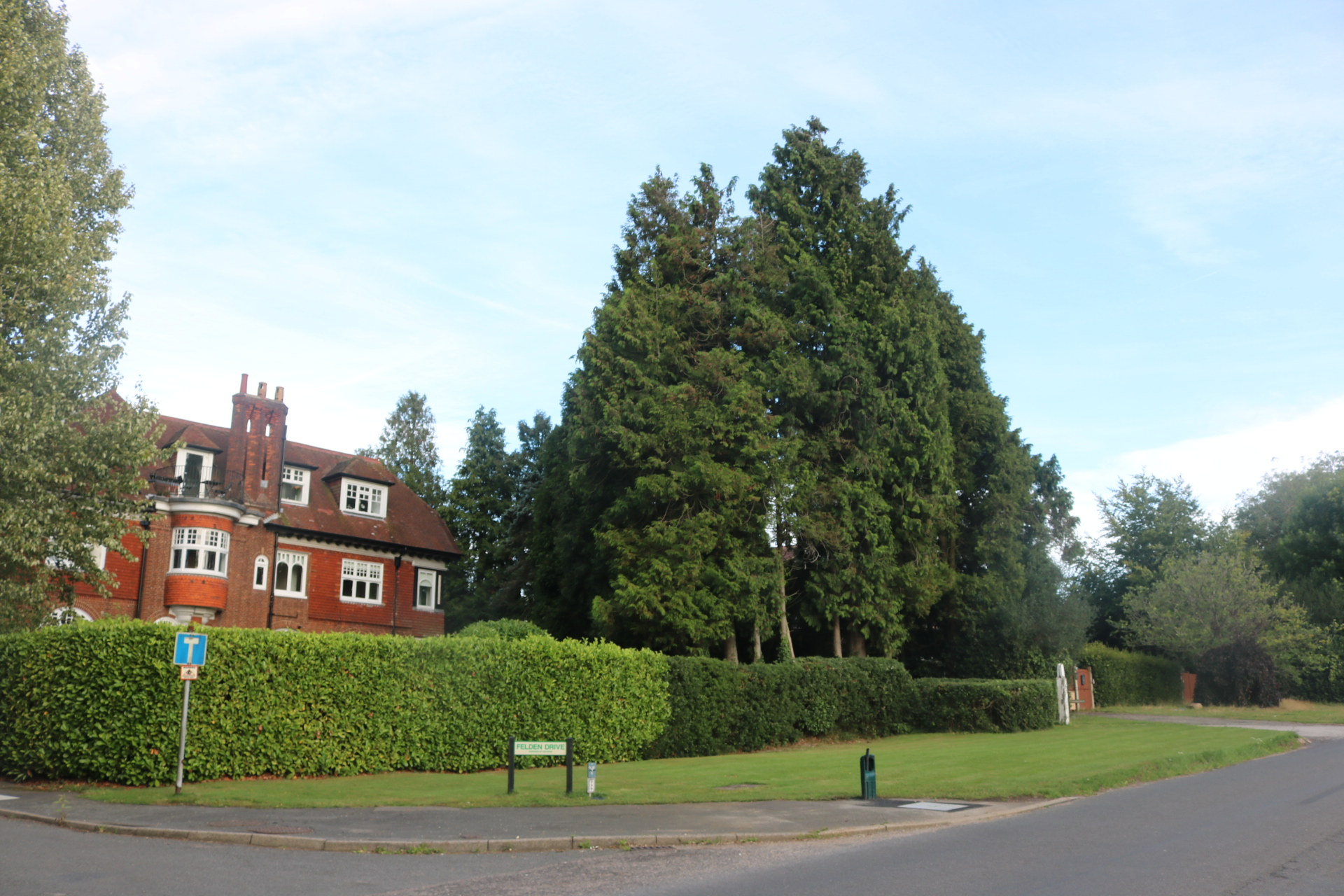
- Felden Lane at the corner of Felden Drive

- Location within Hertfordshire
- Shire county: Hertfordshire
- Region: East
- Country: England
- Sovereign state: United Kingdom
- Post town: Hemel Hempstead
- Postcode district: HP3
- Dialling code: 01442
- Police: Hertfordshire
- Fire: Hertfordshire
- Ambulance: East of England
- UK Parliament: South West Hertfordshire

Felden is a semi-rural neighbourhood of Hemel Hempstead, Hertfordshire, situated to the south west of the town, close to the railway station. At the 2011 Census the population of the neighbourhood was included in the Dacorum Ward of Bovingdon, Flaunden and Chipperfield.

It is separated from the main urban area by main roads, the rail line and Boxmoor. The boundary of Felden extends only from the diverging of Felden Lane, where the sign to the boys brigade is now situated. The 'Felden' sign was removed recently making it unclear that the Felden Hamlet does not extend below this point. Similarly Felden the Hamlet does not extend as far as Box Lane, which is also often claimed to be part of this band of housing.

The ancient Box Lane runs uphill from Boxmoor to Bovingdon and passes through the west of Felden. On this lane stands Box Lane Chapel, a non-conformist chapel dating from the early 17th century. The chapel was officially founded in 1668, was re-built in 1690 and then altered in 1856 and again in 1876. Tradition has it that Oliver Cromwell once worshipped here. It is now a private house after being sold in 1969.

Felden was home to the national headquarters of The Boys' Brigade UK & RoI, Felden Lodge, until Spring 2025 when it was sold to an independent school group specialising in educating children with learning disabilities.

Felden Water Tower opened in 1910 is an octagonal brick tower with a fanciful fairytale appearance. It is 80 feet (24 m) tall and contains 50,600 imp gal (230,000 L) of water. Plans were made to redevelop the building in 2007.
