= Weedon, Buckinghamshire =

Village in Buckinghamshire, England

Coordinates: 51.856°N 0.819°W

Weedon
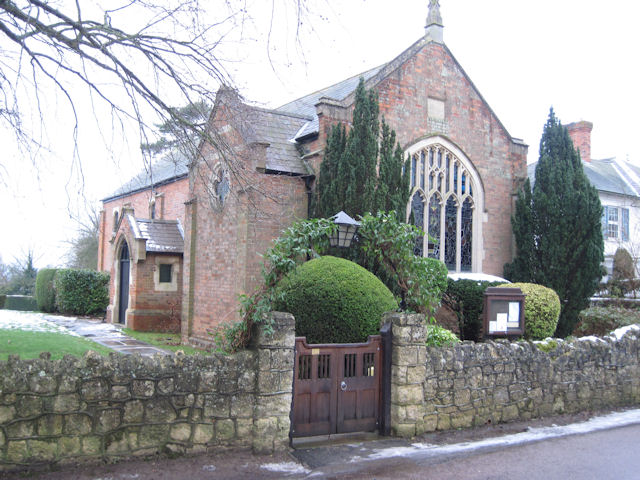
- Chapel at Weedon

- Location within Buckinghamshire
- Interactive map of Weedon
- Population: 275 (2011 Census)
- OS grid reference: SP8118
- Civil parish: Weedon
- Unitary authority: Buckinghamshire
- Ceremonial county: Buckinghamshire
- Region: South East
- Country: England
- Sovereign state: United Kingdom
- Post town: Aylesbury
- Postcode district: HP22
- Dialling code: 01296
- Police: Thames Valley
- Fire: Buckinghamshire
- Ambulance: South Central
- UK Parliament: Aylesbury

Weedon is a village and civil parish north of Aylesbury and south of Hardwick in the Aylesbury Vale district of Buckinghamshire, England. The toponym is derived from the Old English for "hill with a heathen temple". In records dated 1066 the village was recorded as Weodune.

Weedon has a Methodist Chapel and a pub called the Five Elms. To the east of the village is the hamlet of East End.

Portions of the village (and later parish) have been subject to human settlement since the early Bronze Age, with excavations in the early 2000s suggesting that a field system was in operation, and later Roman settlement has also been identified. Some Neolithic flint working has been recovered but there is no indication of anything more than low-level activity.

Some historical sources note that Weedon (and Weedon Hill) are closely associated with the 1642 Battle of Aylesbury, although current opinion is divided as to its significance.

== Housing development ==
Prior to 2011 land within the parish southwest of the village and adjoining the northern edge of Aylesbury was designated a 'major development area called Weedon Hill.

Additionally, an extension of the Chiltern Line was constructed which included a new station, opened in 2008, called Aylesbury Vale Parkway. In 2010 the district council decided that from May 2011 the Weedon Hill development would form part of the new civil parish of Buckingham Park. In 2025 the housing development included 1,035 houses, a community centre and a primary school.
