= Bedgrove =

Housing estate in Aylesbury, Buckinghamshire, England

Coordinates: 51.806283°N 0.783516°W

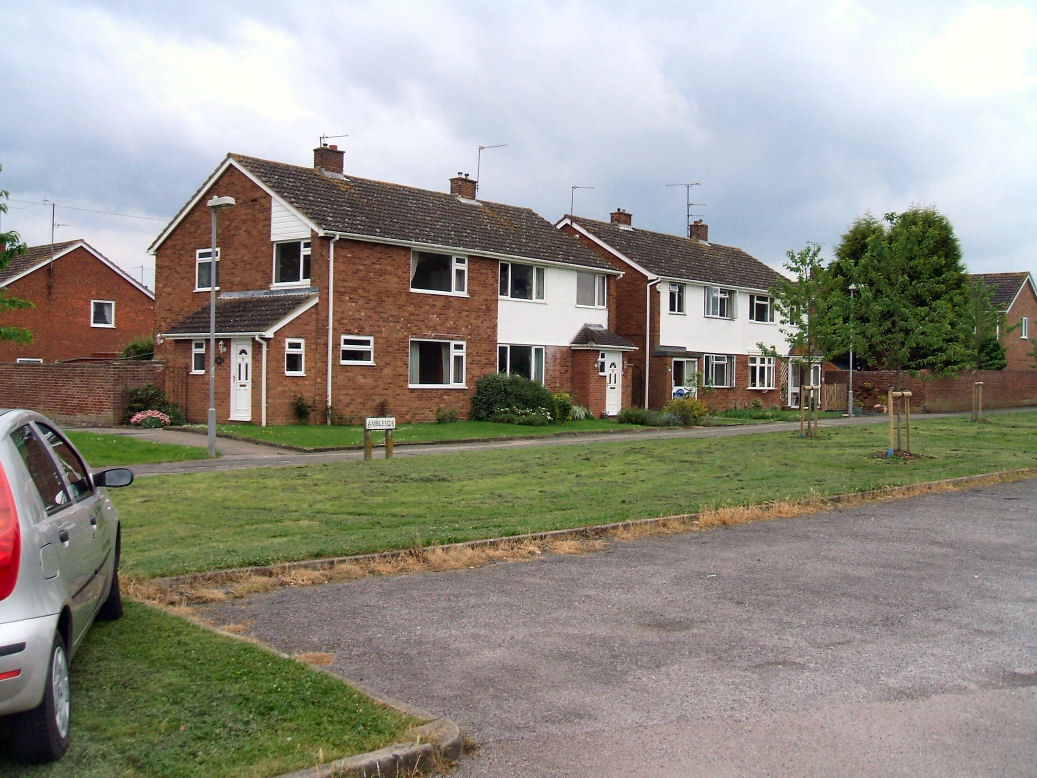
- Typical housing in Bedgrove

- Location within Buckinghamshire
- Population: 9,171 (2001 Census)
- OS grid reference: SP8312
- Civil parish: Aylesbury
- Unitary authority: Buckinghamshire
- Ceremonial county: Buckinghamshire
- Region: South East
- Country: England
- Sovereign state: United Kingdom
- Post town: AYLESBURY
- Postcode district: HP21
- Dialling code: 01296
- Police: Thames Valley
- Fire: Buckinghamshire
- Ambulance: South Central
- UK Parliament: Aylesbury

Bedgrove is one of the housing estates of the town of Aylesbury in Buckinghamshire, though it takes its name from a farm and hamlet that stood in the area until the area was cleared for building in the late 1950s. At the time it was built it was the largest housing estate of its kind in the country. The housing estate is on the south side of the town. The farm (and associated cottages) was where Pevensey Close now stands.

In the 2001 census the population of Bedgrove was 9,171 people.

Also the ancient village of Caldicot was thought to be situated approximately where Caldicot Close is today, hence the name of the new road.

== Facilities ==
In the middle of Bedgrove, there are two churches, one Church of England called Church of the Holy Spirit, and one Roman Catholic Church, called Our Lady of Lourdes. There is also a Baptist church in Limes Avenue.

Bedgrove is served by Bedgrove Infant School, for children aged from three to seven, and Bedgrove Junior School, for children aged from seven to eleven. Both are foundation schools, which each take approximately 480 pupils.

On the southside of Bedgrove is Bedgrove Park, a large field with many football pitches, a community centre, a playground designed for 2-12 year olds and an all-weather pitch designed for youths to play football and netball.

In the heart of Bedgrove is Jansel Square, which consists of several take away restaurants and many shops.

There is also a Pub named 'The Buckinghamshire Yeoman' in Jansel Square.

The Arriva Shires & Essex 'Pink Route' service 8 to Aylesbury serves Bedgrove Monday-Saturday, at a frequency of up to every 20 minutes, which runs via Broughton. Stops on this route serve Welbeck Avenue, Cambourne Avenue, Cam Mead and Long Meadow. For a Sunday bus service, Red Rose Travel operates the 501 service from Aylesbury to Watford which serves two stops in Bedgrove, on Cam Mead and Long Meadow.

== Demography ==
Bedgrove compared
| 2001 UK Census | Bedgrove ward | Aylesbury Vale borough | England |
| Population | 9,171 | 165,748 | 49,138,831 |
| Foreign born | 7.4% | 7.9% | 9.2% |
| White | 95.9% | 94.1% | 90.9% |
| Asian | 2.4% | 3.4% | 4.6% |
| Black | 0.7% | 1% | 2.3% |
| Christian | 77.8% | 73.8% | 71.7% |
| Muslim | 0.5% | 2.7% | 3.1% |
| Hindu | 1.2% | 0.5% | 1.1% |
| No religion | 13.6% | 15.7% | 14.6% |
| Unemployed | 1.5% | 2% | 3.3% |
| Retired | 16.1% | 11% | 13.5% |

At the 2001 UK census, the Bedgrove electoral ward had a population of 9,171. The ethnicity was 95.9% white, 0.9% mixed race, 2.4% Asian, 0.7% black and 0.1% other. The place of birth of residents was 92.6% United Kingdom, 1.1% Republic of Ireland, 2.1% other Western European countries, and 4.2% elsewhere. Religion was recorded as 77.8% Christian, 0.1% Buddhist, 1.2% Hindu, 0.2% Sikh, 0.1% Jewish, and 0.5% Muslim. 13.6% were recorded as having no religion, 0.3% had an alternative religion and 6.2% did not state their religion.

The economic activity of residents aged 16–74 was 45% in full-time employment, 14.7% in part-time employment, 8% self-employed, 1.5% unemployed, 2.9% students with jobs, 3% students without jobs, 16.1% retired, 4.8% looking after home or family, 2.5% permanently sick or disabled and 1.5% economically inactive for other reasons. The industry of employment of residents was 16.4% retail, 13.8% manufacturing, 5.8% construction, 13.7% real estate, 13.2% health and social work, 8.8% education, 5.8% transport and communications, 7.4% public administration, 2.5% hotels and restaurants, 6.4% finance, 0.7% agriculture and 5.5% other. Compared with national figures, the ward had a relatively high proportion of workers in finance and public administration. There were a relatively low proportion in agriculture, hotels and restaurants. Of the ward's residents aged 16–74, 22.8% had a higher education qualification or the equivalent, compared with 19.9% nationwide.
