= Walton Court, Aylesbury =

Housing estate in Aylesbury, Buckinghamshire, England

Coordinates: 51.798495°N 0.820387°W

Walton Court
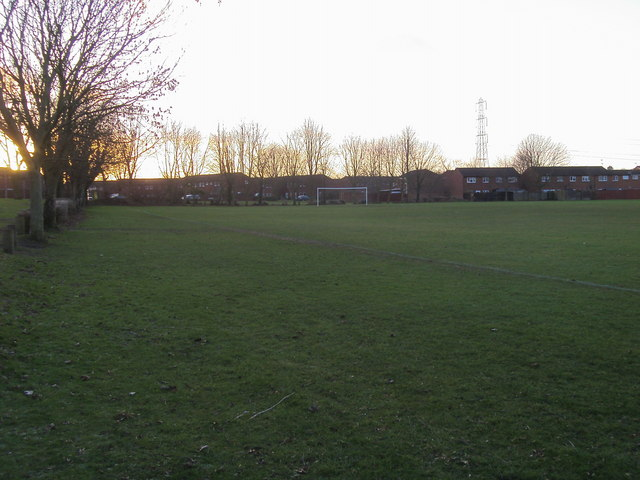
- Walton Court playing field

- Location within Buckinghamshire
- Population: 5,961 (2001 Census)
- OS grid reference: SP8111
- Civil parish: Aylesbury
- Unitary authority: Buckinghamshire
- Ceremonial county: Buckinghamshire
- Region: South East
- Country: England
- Sovereign state: United Kingdom
- Post town: AYLESBURY
- Postcode district: HP21
- Dialling code: 01296
- Police: Thames Valley
- Fire: Buckinghamshire
- Ambulance: South Central
- UK Parliament: Aylesbury

Walton Court is a housing estate in Aylesbury, Buckinghamshire, England.

The Walton Court estate was built during the 1970s as part of a major council housing expansion. The land had formerly been farmland, and for some time the privately owned housing area was known as Walton Court Farm, after the estate, renamed Hawkslade by Estate Agents to reflect the middle class population split to the west side of Ellen Road. The majority of the roads in Walton Court that were built between the 1970s and 1980s are named after British rivers.

Walton Court stretches from the A418 Oxford Road in the north, running to the south-west of the Edinburgh playing fields and Grenville Road, as far as Ellen Road (south), where it meets the adjacent Hawkslade estate. Most of the former council-built 2-, 3- and 4-bedroomed terraced properties are now privately owned and there are a number of three-storey blocks of flats in many closes, along with a few bungalows. The properties that are not privately owned are now managed by Aylesbury Vale Housing Trust.

Although mostly housing, Walton Court also has Ashmead Combined School, a mixed, community primary school, which has approximately 475 pupils from the age of four through to the age of eleven (Nursery to Year 6), Mandeville Upper School (Year 7 to Sixth Form) and had, until 2000, Willowmead School.

On Hannon Road is the former Walton Court Shopping Centre, Walton Court Social Club and flats. The original doctors surgery within the block had outgrown itself by the beginning of the 21st century and the premises is now a nursery. A new community facility was opened adjacent to the former doctors surgery, called the Healthy Living Centre, which features a cafe, Internet facilities and regular educational classes. This has provided a new focal point to the area. A new expanded Mandeville GP Surgery has been built on the Walton Court shopping centre east car park, between the Walton Court shops and Ashmead Combined School. On the opposite side of Hannon Road is a home for the elderly.

The original shops at Walton Court Shopping Centre were arranged around a central courtyard, with flats above and service facilities below or at the rear. The design of the units attracted anti-social behaviour and the area was re-built, to update and modernise the area, during the first decade of the 21st century. The shop units were relocated into the former service bays facing Hannon Road, the old units being converted to additional flats, all arranged around the courtyard and protected with security access. The primary retail unit is operated by the Co-operative group and, as of 2017, the shopping parade boasts a branch of Boots Chemists, a charity shop, a hairdresser's, a bookmaker's, a vet's practice, a launderette and a fish and chip shop. The original Walton Court Social Club has also been fully refurbished and reopened on the same site.

The estate lies roughly half a mile from the famous Stoke Mandeville Hospital. The estate therefore houses many medical, clinical and nursing staff, as well as some spinal patients now living in the community.
