= Botley, Buckinghamshire =

Hamlet in Buckinghamshire, England

Coordinates: 51.708°N 0.583°W

Botley
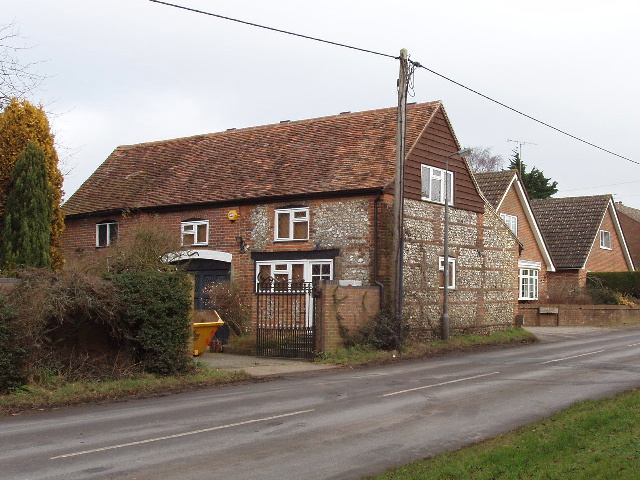

- Location within Buckinghamshire
- OS grid reference: SP9802
- Civil parish: Chesham
- Unitary authority: Buckinghamshire
- Ceremonial county: Buckinghamshire
- Region: South East
- Country: England
- Sovereign state: United Kingdom
- Post town: CHESHAM
- Postcode district: HP5
- Dialling code: 01494
- Police: Thames Valley
- Fire: Buckinghamshire
- Ambulance: South Central
- UK Parliament: Chesham and Amersham

Botley is a hamlet in the civil parish of Chesham, in Buckinghamshire, England.

The hamlet name is Anglo Saxon in origin, and means Botta's Clearing.

Botley includes the Hen and Chickens public house and Goose Acre pond. Most of the houses in Botley are on Botley Road. Botley is divided between the civil parishes of Chesham and Latimer, and merges into the village of Ley Hill.
