= Tyler's Hill =

Hamlet in the United Kingdom

Coordinates: 51.706°N 0.581°W

Tylers Hill is a hamlet in the civil parish of Latimer and Ley Hill, in the Buckinghamshire district, in the ceremonial county of Buckinghamshire, England. It is located to the east of Chesham, near Botley. The name is derived from the historic tile making industry in the region. In 1888, a bricklayer's son named Elbourn discovered a buried earthenware vessel filled with gold coins. Although many were dispersed among local children and bystanders, some were eventually taken by the police for the Treasury. The coins were dated to the reigns of Elizabeth I, James I, and Charles I, suggesting they had been buried around the time of the English Civil War.

Tylers Hill includes St George's Church, and Tylers Hill churchyard for burials from Ley Hill.
