= Fields End =

Hamlet in Hertfordshire, England

Coordinates: 51.761922°N 0.504548°W

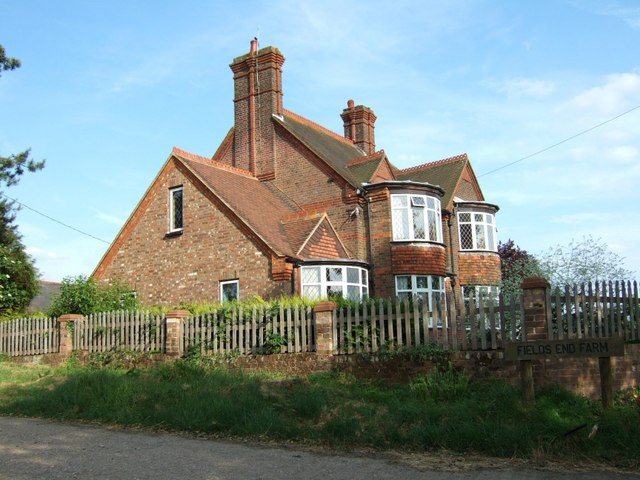
- Fields End Farm, Fields End

- Location within Hertfordshire
- OS grid reference: TL030080
- District: Dacorum
- Shire county: Hertfordshire
- Region: East
- Country: England
- Sovereign state: United Kingdom
- Post town: HEMEL HEMPSTEAD
- Postcode district: HP1
- Dialling code: 01442
- Police: Hertfordshire
- Fire: Hertfordshire
- Ambulance: East of England
- UK Parliament: Hemel Hempstead

Fields End is a hamlet to the North West of Hemel Hempstead, just beyond Warner's End on Boxted Road, in Hertfordshire, England. At the 2011 Census the population of the hamlet was included in the Dacorum ward of Chaulden and Warner's End.

The village is formally recognised as village within Hertfordshire by Hertfordshire County Council.

Fields End consisted largely of agricultural fields until planning permission was granted for a new residential estate to begin construction on green belt land between Warner's End and Potten End in the 1980s. The estate was completed in the late 1990s, with Dacorum council having made several attempts to continue to develop the remaining agricultural land of Fields End Farm in the intervening years.

Attempts to develop the fields around Fields End continue to be investigated by Dacorum council, with formal objections being registered at recently as December 2008.

Local schools are Potten End School, Micklem Primary and formerly Martindale Primary schools (closed 2008), and the John F Kennedy Catholic School. The sites of Fields End Infants and Junior School and The Halsey School, the neighbouring High School both formerly on the south-east side of Polehanger Lane near the lower spur of Fields End Lane from the end of Boxted Road now lies beneath the Fields End estate housing development which was constructed in the early 1990s.

Neighbouring towns are the Hemel Hempstead district of Warner's End and the villages of Potten End and Little Heath.
