= Bishop's messenger =

A bishop's messenger was a woman appointed a lay reader by the Church of England during the First World War due to the shortage of male clergy. Messengers were first appointed in 1917 in many dioceses of the Church of England.

Meanwhile, women were appointed to run missions, and in some cases church congregations. In the absence of men, however, many continued in their work after the war ended.

No further female lay readers were appointed until 1969. The women were organised into the Diocesan Order of Women Messengers (DOWM). The last bishop's messenger in England was Bessie Bangay, who died in 1987.

From 1928, bishop's messengers were also appointed in the Diocese of Rupert's Land. The first one was Marguerita Fowler (1884-1970), based at St. Faith's Church.

== Diocese of St Davids ==
This Welsh diocese also appointed clergymen to the post of Bishop's Messenger.
