= Charles Mills Sheldon =

War correspondent, artist and book illustrator

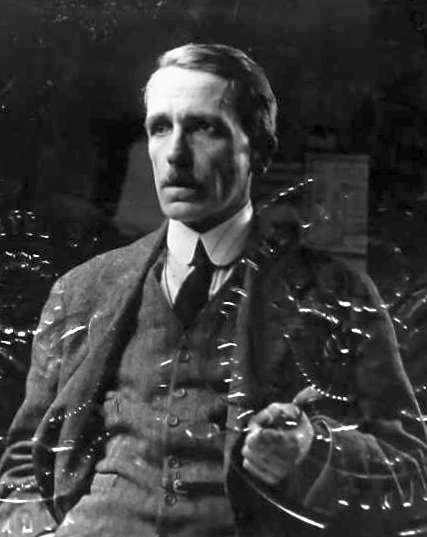
- Passport photo for Charles Mills Sheldon (1866-1928) at age 52
- Born: 24 June 1866; Lawrenceburg, Indiana, United States
- Died: 14 March 1928 (aged 61); Chiswick Hospital, Chiswick, London
- Occupations: War correspondent; artist; book illustrator
- Years active: 1889–1915
- Notable work: War reporting for Black and White

Charles Mills Sheldon (24 June 1866 – 14 March 1928) was a war correspondent, artist, and book illustrator, born in the United States, who moved to Europe in 1890.

== Early life ==
Sheldon was born in Lawrenceburg, Indiana, on 24 June 1866 to George Wilbur Sheldon (11 November 1843 – 3 January 1922) and Jeanette Mills (c. 1847 – 2 February 1929). He was educated at public schools in Lawrenceburg and Des Moines. The 1880 census found him living at home with his parents at age 14, in Des Moines, Iowa. While Hogson states that his father was a publisher, the census return for both 1880 and 1910 gives his father's trade as a tinner, in a tin shop.

== Work ==
After initially travelling the Southern United States to illustrate articles for the Associated Press in 1889, Sheldon moved to Paris where he studied at the Académie Julian under Jean-Joseph Benjamin-Constant and Jules Joseph Lefebvre. From Paris he provided illustrations of happenings there for the Pall Mall Budget. (Note: As the Pall Mall Budget was a weekly compendium of stories from the Pall Mall Gazette, it is not clear if the illustrations were used only for the Budget or also for the Gazette.) Among the magazines he illustrated were:

- Pall Mall Budget
- The Ludgate Monthly (which was renamed a number of times)
- The Strand Magazine
- Black and White
- Frank Leslie's Illustrated Newspaper
- The Royal Magazine

=== Work as war correspondent ===
He was a war correspondent for Black and White, and later for Leslie's for a number of conflicts, including:

- The Jameson Raid (1895–1896), for which he famously packed and left within 17 minutes of getting notice. The raid was long over even before Sheldon set out, and his dispatches home included things like a picture of a gold mine in the Transvaal.
- Kitchener's campaign in the Anglo-Egyptian conquest of Sudan in 1886. This time he got 3 hours notice to pack, as a cablegram had got lost in the post office in Johannesburg for seven days. This campaign was also notable for the libel case between two war correspondents Knight and Attridge. In a letter home, Knight had accused Attridge of cowardice, and of abandoning the man he was sharing a hut with to death by cholera. Attridge sued and won damages of £1,000, an enormous sum at the time. Sheldon gave evidence at the trial.
- In Cuba for the Spanish–American War in 1898
- In South Africa for the Second Boer War from 1899 on
- In India for the 1903 Delhi Durbar. His son Eugene later presented 156 photographs that Sheldon had taken at the time to the India Office Library.

==== Samples of illustrations from the Sudan campaign ====
The following illustrations were drawn by Sheldon as war correspondent for Black and White for Kitchener's campaign for the Anglo-Egyptian conquest of Sudan. The days of the illustrator war correspondent were already numbered. Hodson notes that photography was becoming the dominant art and that this, and the redrawing of war correspondents' sketches to be more dramatic and photograph-like, was already leading to a falling-off in the quality of illustrations. Black and White was already redrawing some of Sheldon's sketches in this way. By the time of the campaign in Cuba, Sheldon was providing photographs for publication as well as sketches.

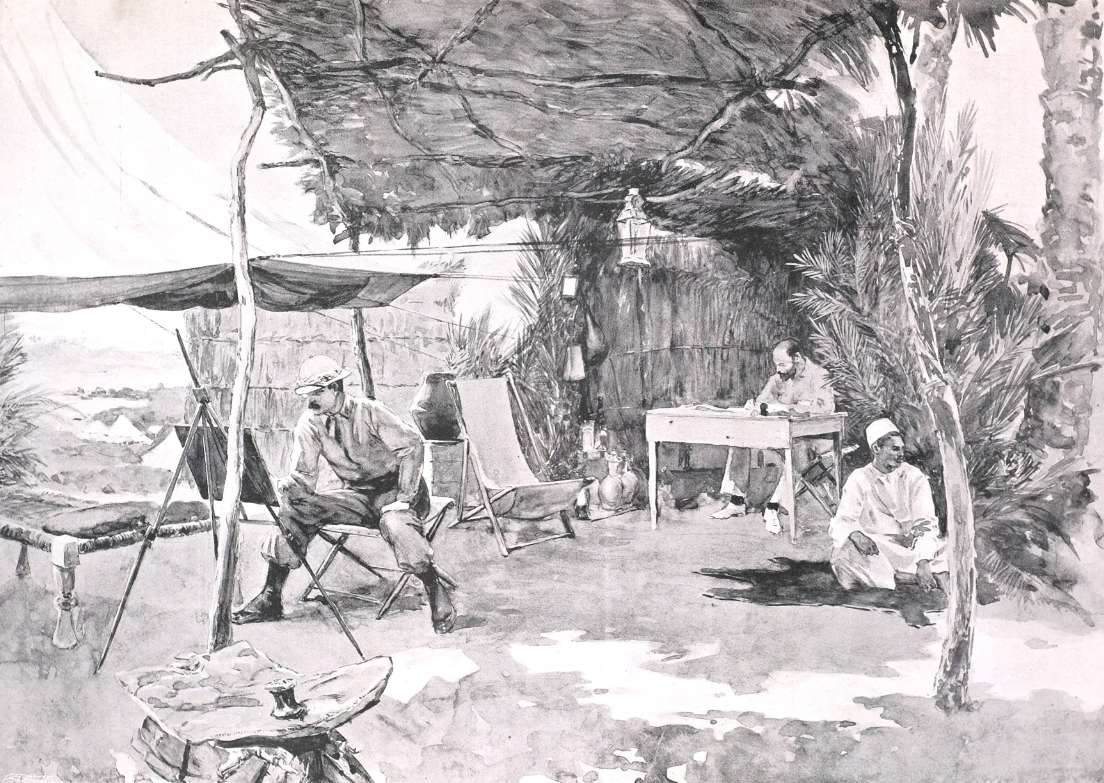
Press correspondents working in the shade at Ferkeh

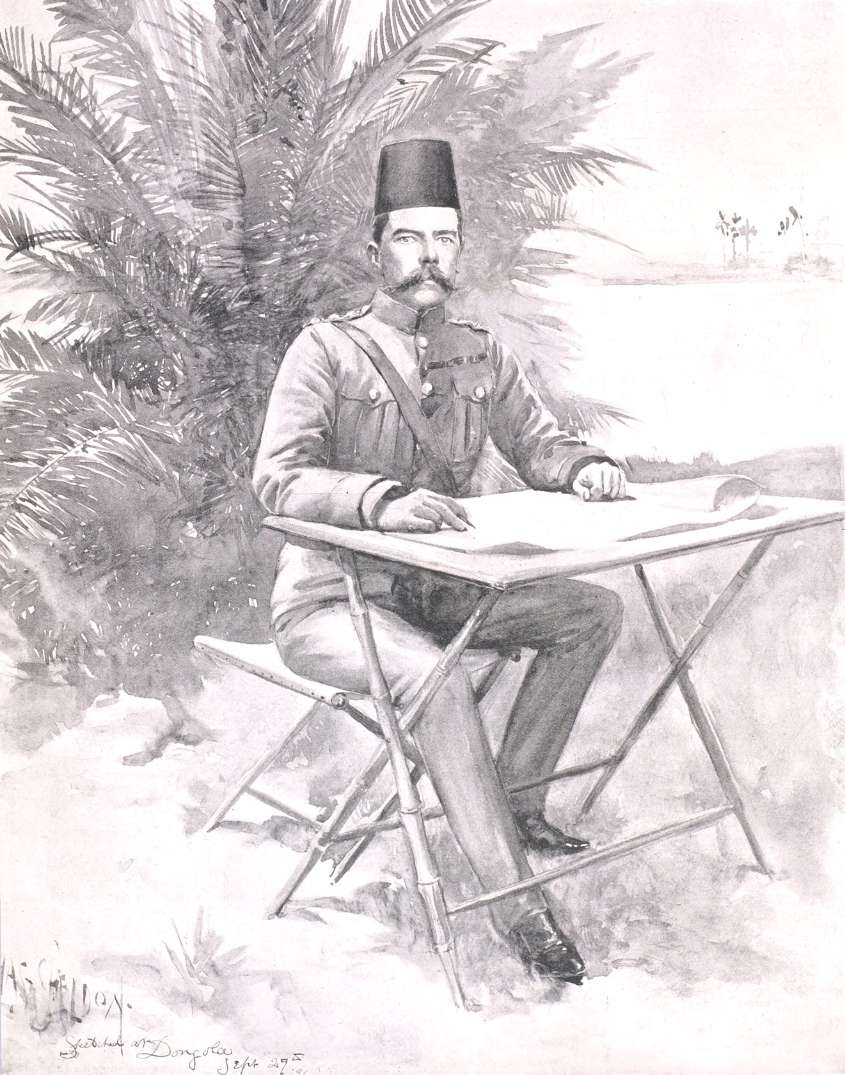
Lord Kitchener (then Sir Kitchener) working at a folding table in Sudan.

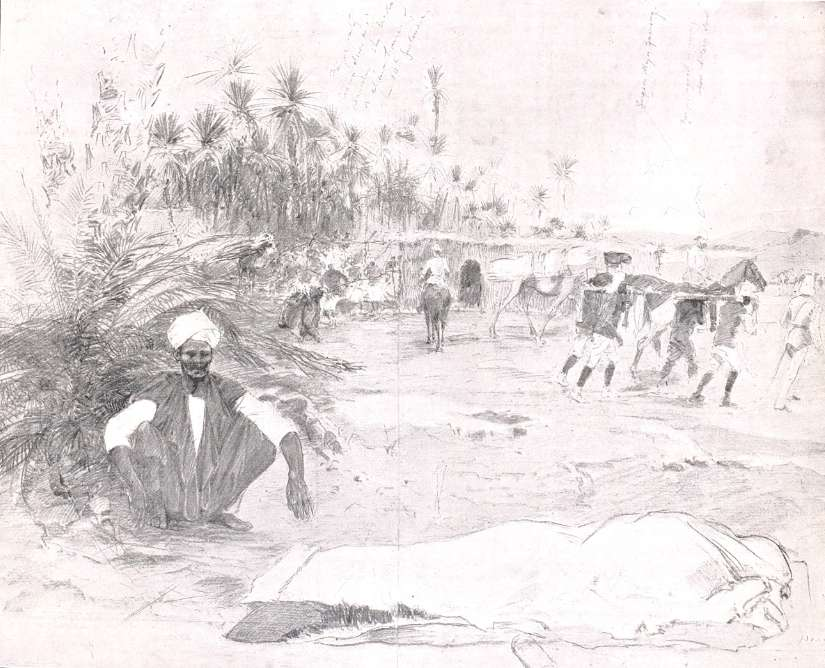
The outbreak of cholera at Kosher in Sudan

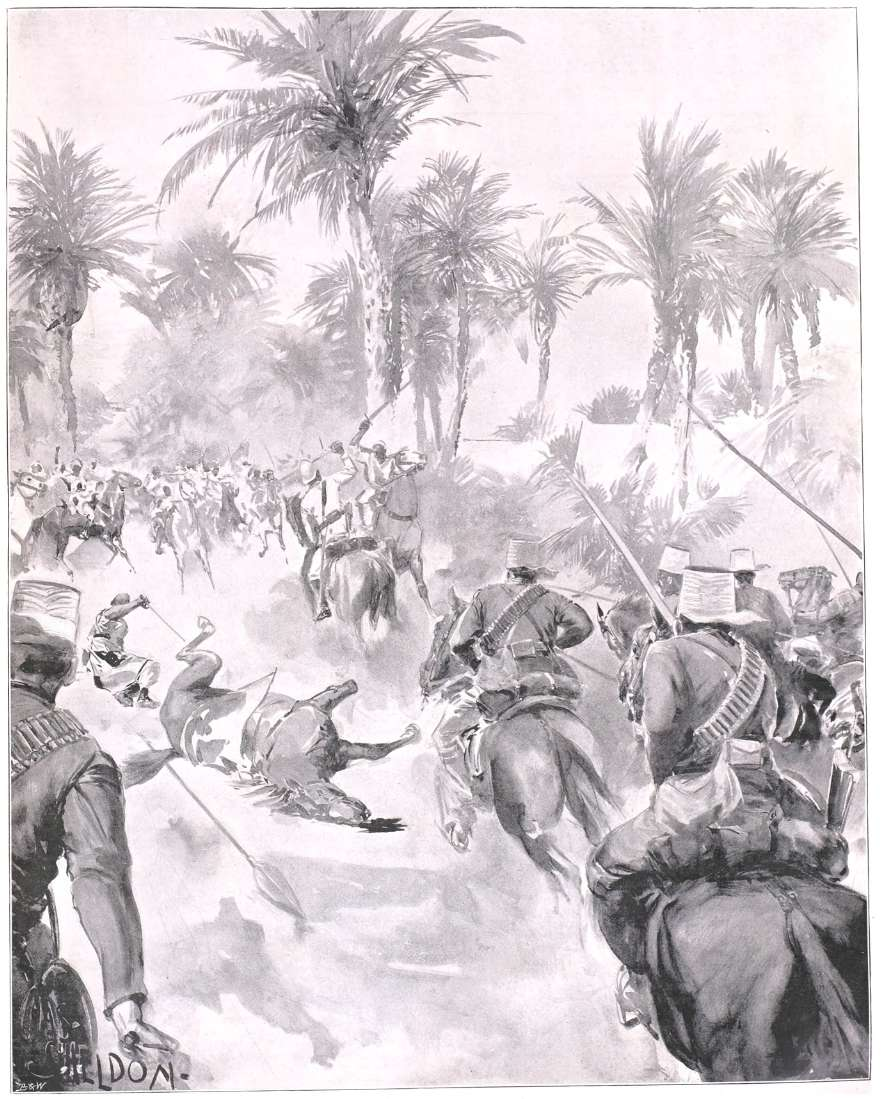
Cavalry charge in Sudan

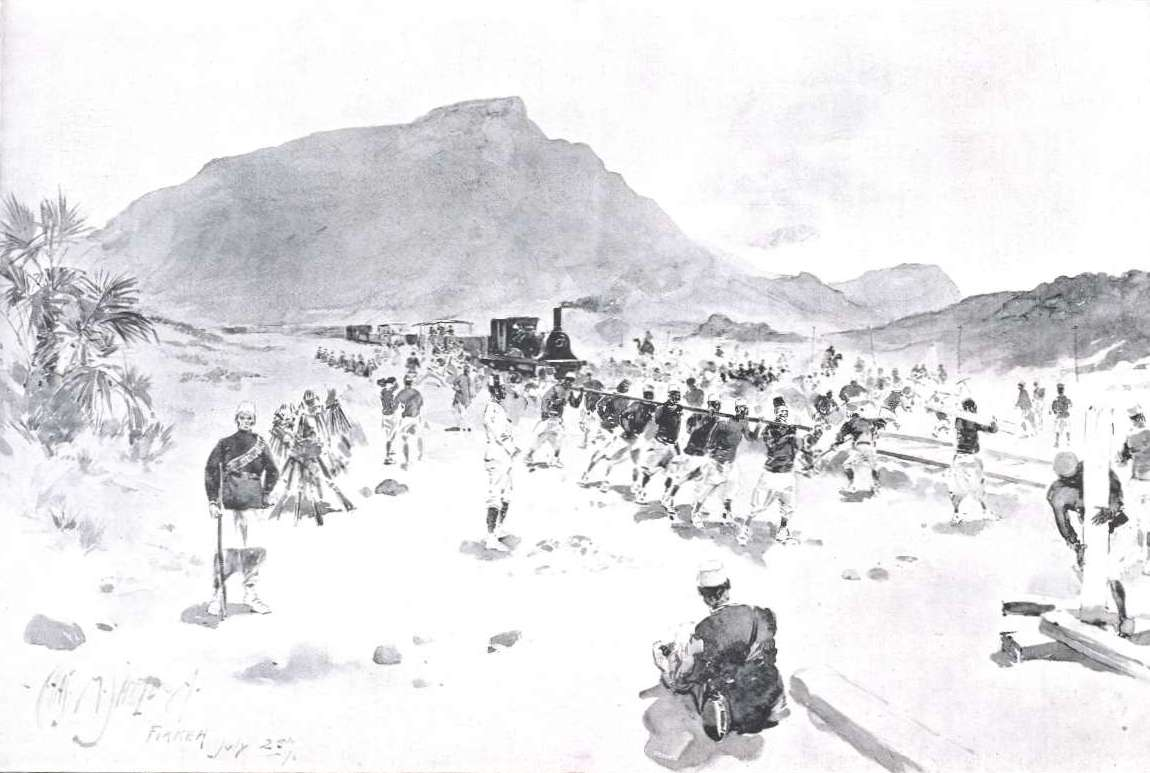
The logistics railway for the Sudan Campaign approaching Ferkeh

=== Work as a book illustrator ===
Most of the books he illustrated were boys' adventure books; these illustrations frequently show fighting and conflict. Among the books he illustrated were:

- 1886: True to the Old Flag: A Tale of the American War of Independence by G. A. Henty
- 1899: Won by the Sword: A Tale of the Thirty Years' War by G.A. Henty
- 1899: The Four Miss Whittingtons by Geraldine Mockler
- 1900: In the Irish Brigade: A Tale of War in Flanders and Spain by G.A. Henty
- 1900: Under the Rebel's Reign: A Story of Egyptian Revolt by Charles Neufeld
- 1901: The Goddess of Excelsior by Bret Harte
- 1902: To Herat and Cabul, A Story of the First Afghan War by G.A. Henty
- 1903: In the grip of the mullah : A tale of adventure in Somaliland by Frederick Sadleir Brereton
- 1904: Tom Burnaby: A story of Uganda and the great Congo forest by Herbert Strang
- 1905: The Queen of Shindy Flat by Bessie Marchant
- 1906: !Tention: A Story of Boy-Life during the Peninsular War by George Manville Fenn
- 1907: On the Trail of the Arabs: A Story of Heroic Deeds in Africa by Herbert Strang
- 1908: The island traders: A tale of the South Seas by Alexander Macdonald
- 1910: John Bargreave's Gold. A tale of adventures in the Caribbean by F.S. Brereton
- 1911: The Invisible Island - A Story of the Far North of Queensland by Alexander MacDonald
- 1912: Under the Chinese dragon: A tale of Mongolia. by F.S. Brereton
- 1912: Captured at Tripoli: A tale of adventure by Percy F. Westerman
- 1912: The Nameless Prince: A tale of Plantagenet days by Grace I. Whitham
- 1914: Pioneers in Tropical America by Harry Johnston
- 1914: Edgar the Ready: A Tale of the Third Edward's Reign by W. P. Shervill
- 1914: The King's Knight: A tale of the days of King Edward III by Grace I. Whitham
- 1915: A sturdy young Canadian by Frederick Sadleir Brereton
- 1915: Chaloner of the Bengal Cavalry: A Tale of the Indian Mutiny by Percival Lancaster

==== Sample of book illustration ====
The following illustrations were drawn by Sheldon for Under the Chinese dragon: A tale of Mongolia (by F.S. Brereton)

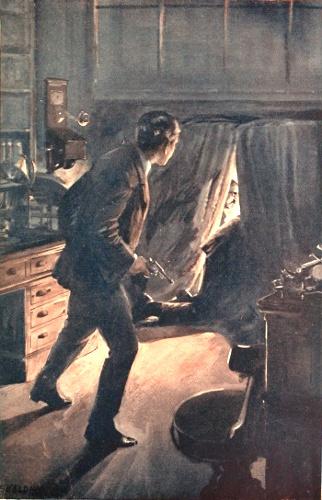
David finds burglars at the store

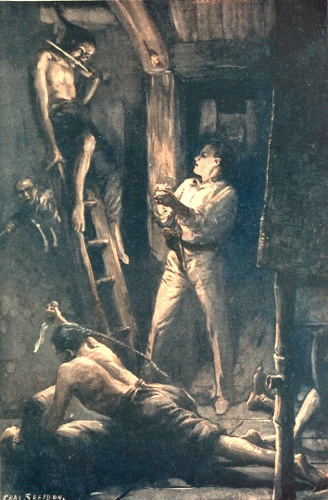
A flame suddenly illuminated the struggle between decks

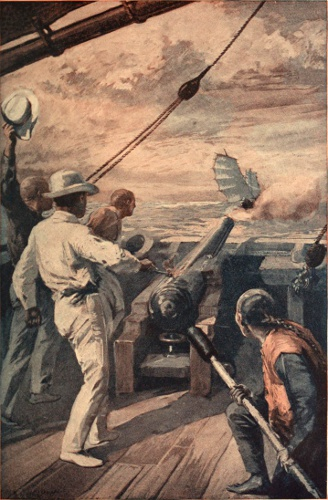
Cheers greet the success of the fifth shot

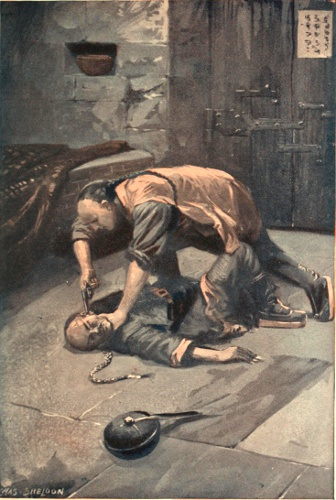
David subdues the assailant

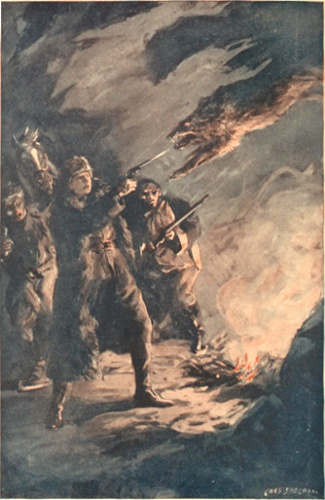
David quickly fired his revolver at the attacking wolf

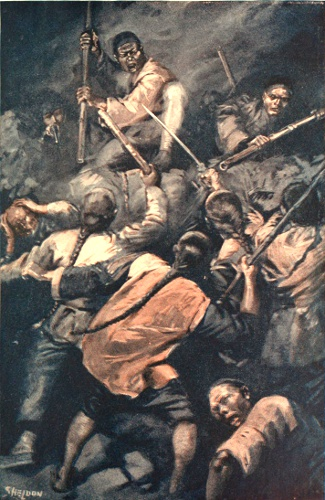
They stormed the barricade

== Marriage and family ==
Sheldon married Grace Mary Garland (1868–1935), a childhood friend, at St George Hanover Square on 26 November 1896. He had just returned from the Sudan where he had been a war correspondent. Grace was the daughter of Eugene Fitch (1846–1918) an inventor, who invented, among other things an early mechanical digital clock. and Fannie Garland (1848–1902).

The couple had at least two children:

- Grace Jeanette Sheldon (1899–1915).
- Eugene Fitch Mills Sheldon (1905–1991) who married Jean Raymond (1914–) in Paris on 27 July 1934. The couple had a son, born in Zug, Switzerland in 1936. His mother died at his home in Zug in 1935. She was probably living with him there as her most recent passport had been issued in Zürich on 17 May 1934.

The 1901 census found Sheldon with his wife and daughter at 3 Bath Road in Chiswick, London, which was still his address on the electoral register some 12 years later.

== Death ==
Sheldon died on 14 March at Chiswick Hospital in Chiswick, London. He was living at 45a Fairfax Road, Bedford Park, Chiswick, London at the time. His effects were valued at £1,417 12s 5d. His widow was still living at this address in 1930.
