= Chaulden =

Residential district in Hertfordshire, England

Coordinates: 51°45′01″N 0°30′11″W

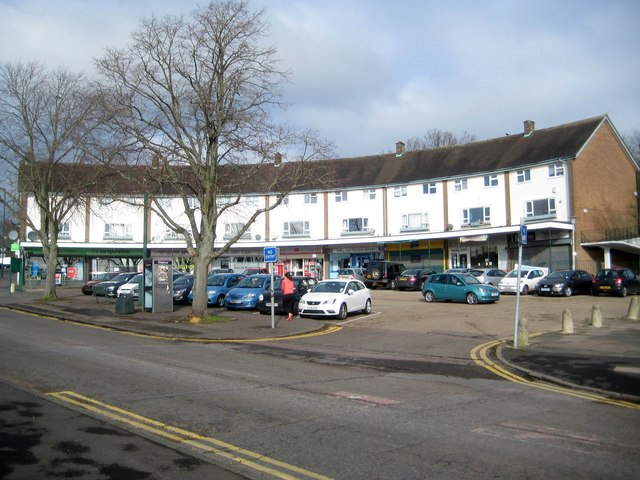
The shopping centre at Long Chaulden

Chaulden is a residential district in Hemel Hempstead, Hertfordshire, England, located west of the town centre and bordering on open countryside. It was an early development in the construction of Hemel Hempstead new town, commenced in 1953 and has its own neighbourhood shopping centre.

== History ==
The name Chaulden can be traced back to 1523 as a local field name and as meaning a chalky valley.

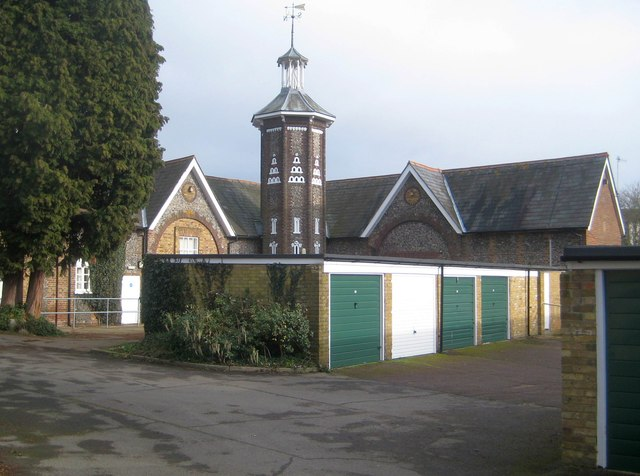
Chaulden house tower is all that remains of Chaulden House.

A country house and estate called Chaulden House occupied the area during the nineteenth century. Chaulden House stables and an octagonal tower dating from the mid-19th century are all that now remain of the house. The tower may have been a dovecote. For many years a waterwheel on the River Bulbourne pumped water up to the house. The house was the home of the writer, Colonel Frederick Brereton in the early decades of the 20th century.

The ancient Chaulden Lane is thought to preserve the route of Akeman Street, the Roman Road along the Bulbourne valley

A large part of the site was previously occupied by Pixies Hill – a children's camp run by the National Camps Corporation. The old camp buildings were converted into the district's first school before permanent schools could be constructed.

Building work on the new town district commenced in 1953 with the first houses occupied in December of that year.

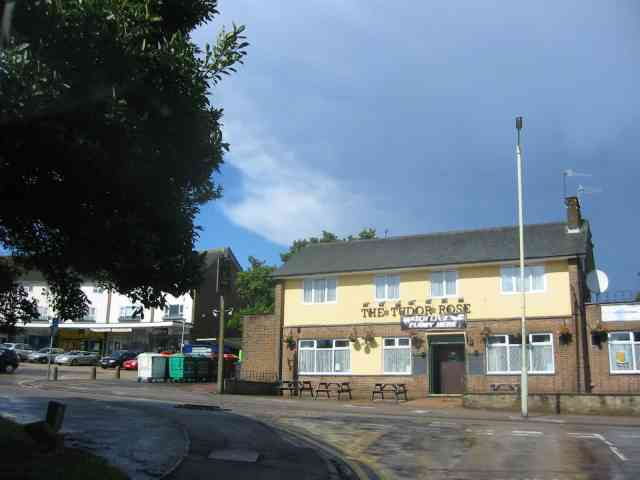
The Tudor Rose pub, built in 1957 adjacent to the Chaulden Neighbourhood centre parade of shops

The Chaulden Neighbourhood centre – a parade of shops set in a crescent around a car park – was completed in 1958. A nearby pub, the Tudor Rose, also built by the New Town corporation, celebrates Hemel Hempstead's link to the Tudor King Henry VIII, who gave the town its charter.

The population of the appropriate Dacorum Ward (Chaulden and Warner's End) at the 2011 Censuswas 9,146.

== Sport ==
Hemel Hempstead (Camelot) Rugby Club play on Chaulden Meadow off Chaulden Lane.
