= Kingsbrook, Buckinghamshire =

Village and civil parish in Buckinghamshire, England

Coordinates: 51°49′30″N 0°46′37″W

Kingsbrook
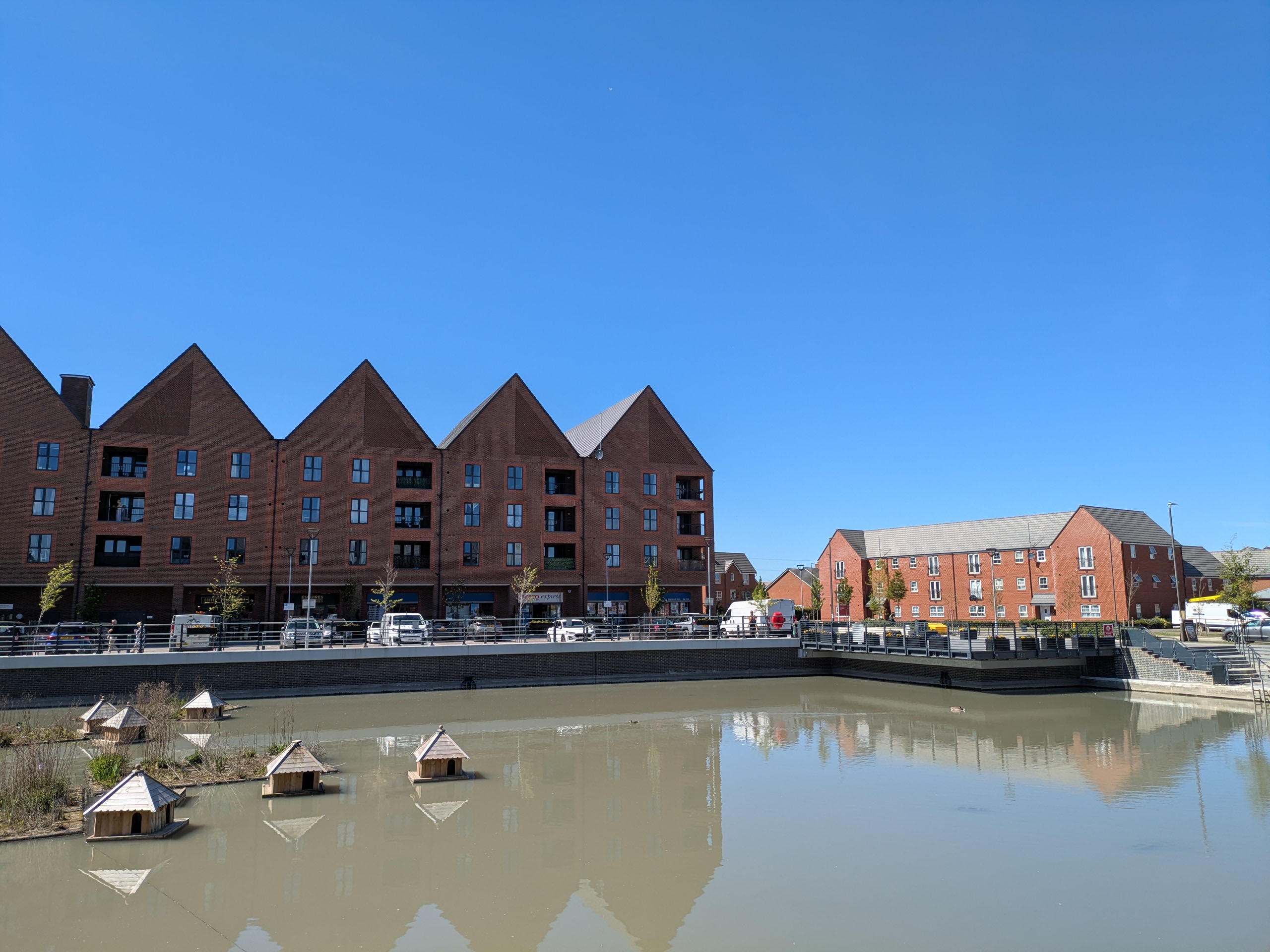
- Canal basin at Kingsbrook

- Location within Buckinghamshire
  - London: 36 miles (58 km)
- Civil parish: Kingsbrook
- Unitary authority: Buckinghamshire Council
- Ceremonial county: Buckinghamshire
- Region: South East
- Country: England
- Sovereign state: United Kingdom
- Post town: AYLESBURY
- Police: Thames Valley
- Fire: Buckinghamshire
- Ambulance: South Central
- UK Parliament: Aylesbury

Kingsbrook is a housing development and civil parish to the north-east of Aylesbury in Buckinghamshire, England, around 1.6 miles (2.5 km) from the town centre and almost contiguous with the town.

Kingsbrook comprises mostly new build housing in the "Oakfield Village", "Canal Quarter" and "Orchard Green" neighbourhoods, each described by the developers as a village. Its first primary school opened in September 2021 and the secondary school opened the following year. A second primary school, Orchard View, will open in 2026. Development started in early 2016.

The parish was established in 2020 when the former parish of Bierton with Broughton was divided into three.

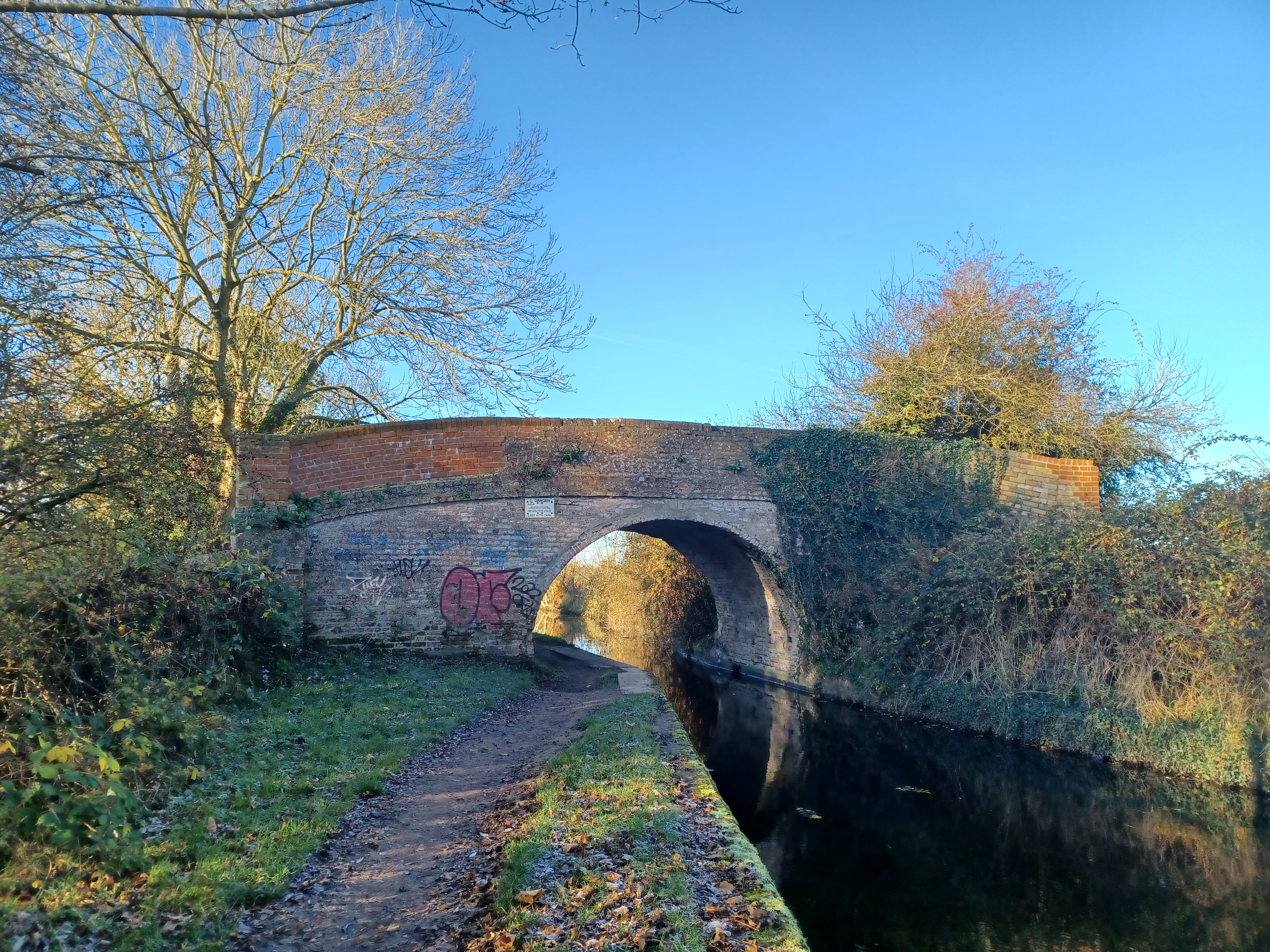
An old canal built in 1794 , which is now part of Kingsbrook.

== Transport ==
Kingsbrook is served by Arriva buses X4 and 100X between Aylesbury, Leighton Buzzard and Milton Keynes.
