= Aylesbury Vale Parkway railway station =

Railway station in Buckinghamshire, England

Aylesbury Vale Parkway
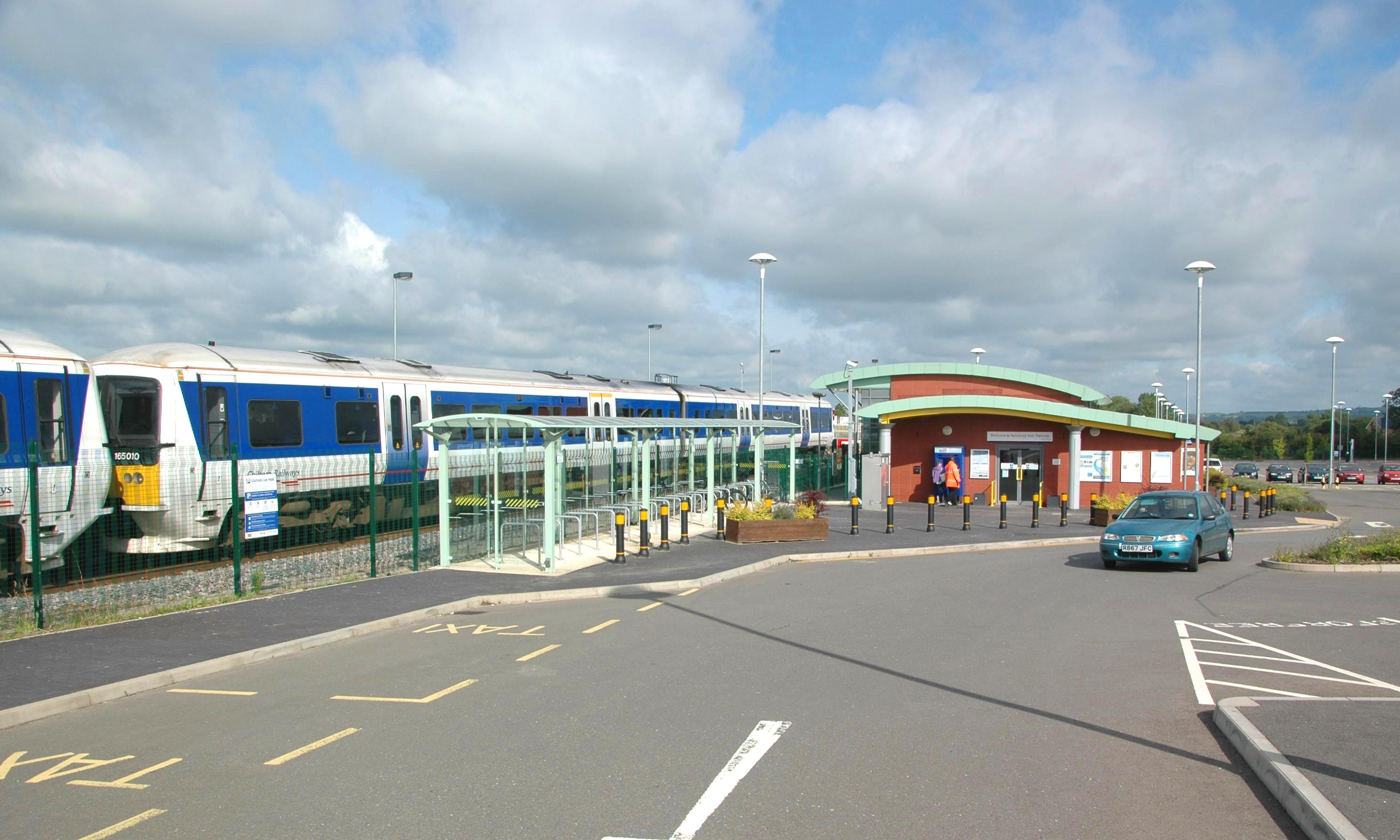
- The station forecourt, showing the taxi rank (left), bicycle shelter (centre) and booking hall (right)

General information
- Location: Aylesbury, Buckinghamshire, England
- Coordinates: 51.8319°N 0.8612°W
- Grid reference: SP786153
- Manager: Chiltern Railways
- Platforms: 1

Other information
- Station code: AVP
- Classification: DfT category E

Key dates
- 14 December 2008: Opened

Passengers
- 2020/21: ▼36,706
- 2021/22: ▲86,896
- 2022/23: ▲0.104 million
- 2023/24: ▲0.109 million
- 2024/25: ▲0.128 million
Location
Notes
- Passenger statistics from the Office of Rail and Road

Aylesbury Vale Parkway railway station serves the villages north-west of Aylesbury, in Buckinghamshire, England, along with the northern suburbs of the town. It is the northern terminus of the London-Aylesbury line. The station and all trains serving it are operated by Chiltern Railways.

== History ==
Aylesbury Vale Parkway lies on the former Metropolitan and Great Central Joint Railway, which formed part of the Great Central Main Line route linking London and Aylesbury with the East Midlands and North of England. In April 2006, the Office of the Deputy Prime Minister announced that it would provide £8.17 million for track and signalling improvements to the existing line, which then was only used to carry freight. A further £2.8 million was invested by Chiltern Railways' owner Laing Rail and £1 million by Buckinghamshire County Council.

Construction began in October 2007 and the rail works were completed by Carillion Rail.

The station was originally not due to be completed until 2010, but actually opened on 14 December 2008, although the station building itself did not open until 1 June 2009. In the interim, while the station buildings were being completed, tickets and facilities were provided from Portakabins.

== Facilities ==
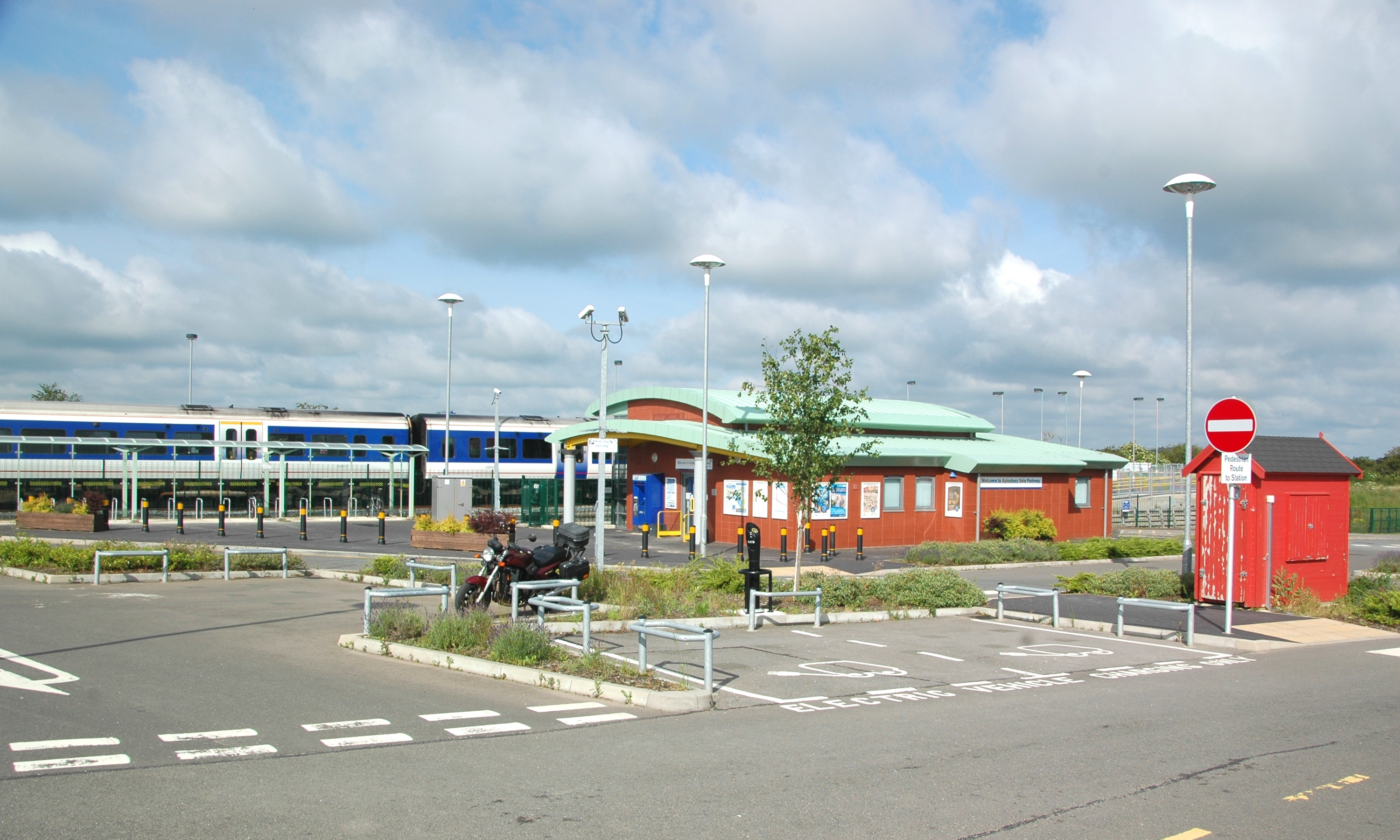
Motorcycle parking bays (left) and electric vehicle charging bay (right)

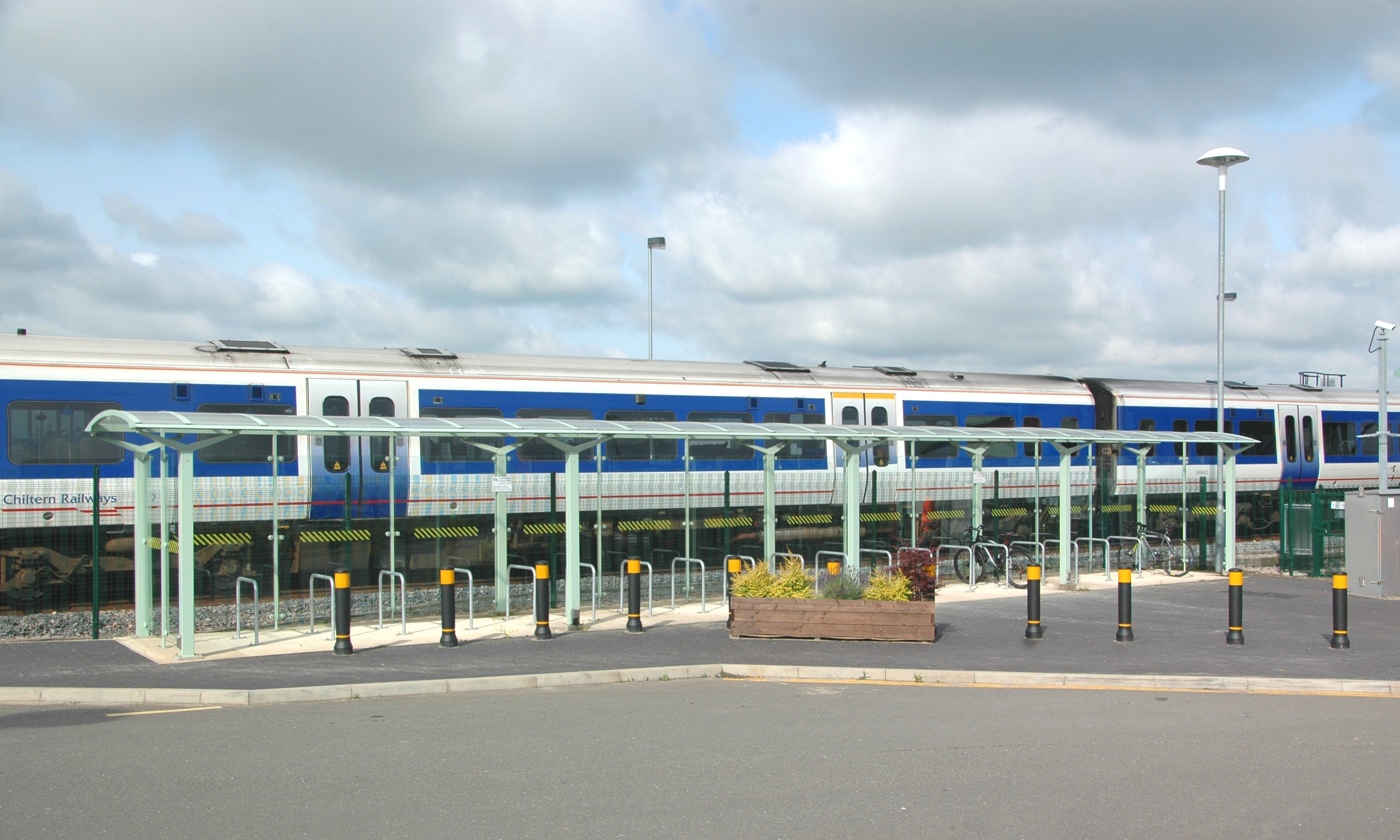
Bicycle shelter

The station has a ticket office, which is staffed six mornings per week. There is a car park with 501 spaces, a charging point for electric vehicles, and parking bays for motorcycles and bicycles. There is also a taxi rank.

== Services ==
The general off-peak service is one departure per hour to London Marylebone, via Aylesbury and Amersham. In peak periods, there are up to three trains per hour to Marylebone. The journey time to Aylesbury is about four minutes.

Preceding station	National Rail	Following station
Terminus	Chiltern Railways; London–Aylesbury line	Aylesbury

== Onward connections ==
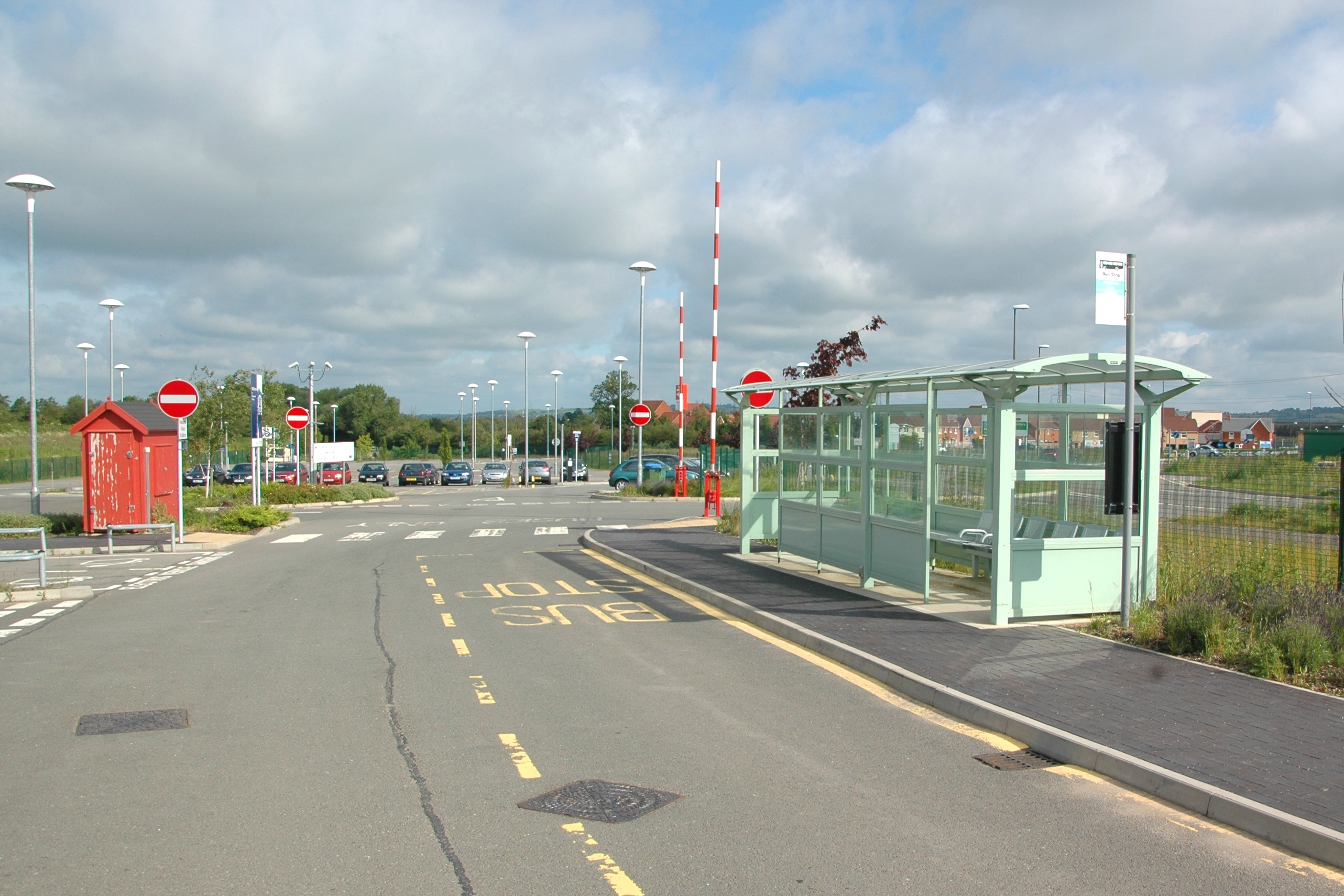
Bus stop and shelter for route 16

The station has links to existing public transport bus services along the A41 corridor. Red Rose Travel operates route 16 to Aylesbury town centre, Waddesdon, Steeple Claydon and Marsh Gibbon.

== East West Rail ==
In 2011, East West Rail planned to extend passenger services north-east from Aylesbury to Milton Keynes Central and Bedford by 2025, by rebuilding the line via Calvert to Claydon LNE Junction. However, in November 2020 it was reported that this service may be dropped from the first phase.

In March 2021, the East West Rail Company announced that its opening plans for the new railway have changed, notably deferring a connection to Aylesbury indefinitely.

== See also ==
- East West Rail Consortium
