= Hardwick, Buckinghamshire =

Village in Buckinghamshire, England

Coordinates: 51.8634°N 0.8320°W

Hardwick
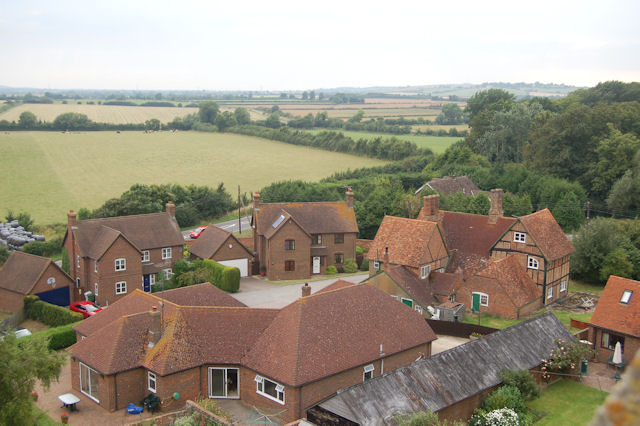
- Hardwick from the church tower, 2008

- Location within Buckinghamshire
- Population: 315 (2011 Census)
- OS grid reference: SP805192
- Civil parish: Hardwick
- Unitary authority: Buckinghamshire
- Ceremonial county: Buckinghamshire
- Region: South East
- Country: England
- Sovereign state: United Kingdom
- Post town: AYLESBURY
- Postcode district: HP22
- Dialling code: 01296
- Police: Thames Valley
- Fire: Buckinghamshire
- Ambulance: South Central
- UK Parliament: Aylesbury

Hardwick is both a village and a civil parish within the Aylesbury Vale district in Buckinghamshire, England. It is in the Aylesbury Vale, about four miles north of Aylesbury.

Hardwick is a common place name in England, of Old English origin meaning 'livestock farm'. In the Domesday Book of 1086 the village was known as Harduich.

Nearby Weedon is a hamlet in the parish of Hardwick.

The parish church is dedicated to St Mary the Virgin, and the churchyard contains a grave for the soldiers who died during the English Civil War at the Battle of Aylesbury in 1642.
