= Queens Park, Aylesbury =

Coordinates: 51.814438°N 0.803563°W

Queens Park
- The Grand Union Canal with Queens Park to the right

- Location within Buckinghamshire
- OS grid reference: SP8213
- Civil parish: Aylesbury
- Unitary authority: Buckinghamshire
- Ceremonial county: Buckinghamshire
- Region: South East
- Country: England
- Sovereign state: United Kingdom
- Post town: AYLESBURY
- Postcode district: HP21
- Dialling code: 01296
- Police: Thames Valley
- Fire: Buckinghamshire
- Ambulance: South Central
- UK Parliament: Aylesbury

Queens Park is a late Victorian and early Edwardian area of Aylesbury in Buckinghamshire, England. It was one of the first developments outside the historic centre of the town, lying just south of the Aylesbury branch of the Grand Union Canal. Queens Park is mainly made up of terraced cottages with the occasional later semi-detached or detached property. Non-residential property is limited to the Queens Park Centre, a local arts and crafts venue, and the Millwrights public house.

Bordering Queens Park to the south is the former hamlet of Walton.

== Images ==
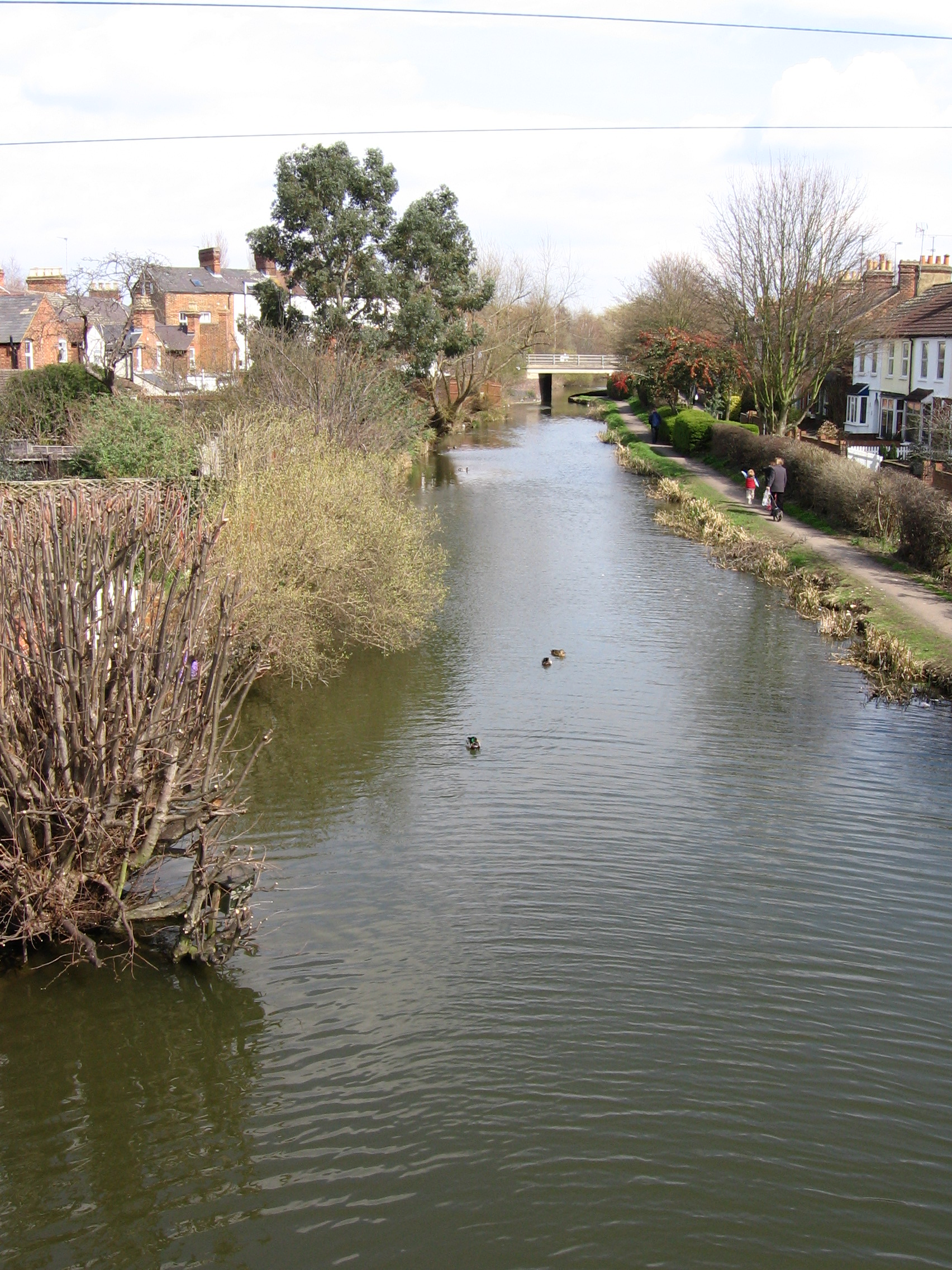
The Grand Union Canal with Queens Park to the right

Queens Park under snow
