= Park School =

== United Kingdom ==
- Park Community School, Havant, England
- Park High School, Stanmore, England
- Stocklake Park Community School (formerly known as Park School), Aylesbury, England
- Park Community School, Barnstaple, England

== United States ==
- Park School of Baltimore, Baltimore County, Maryland
- Park Elementary School (Moorhead, Minnesota), listed in the National Register of Historic Places in Clay County, Minnesota
- Park School (Omaha), Nebraska
- The Park School, Brookline, MA
- Park Elementary School, Natrona County School District in Natrona County, Wyoming

== See also ==
- Roy H. Park School of Communications, Ithaca College in Ithaca, New York, US
- Lindsay Park Elementary School, South Eastern, British Columbia, Canada
