= QPC =

QPC may refer to:

- Quantum point contact, in physics
- The Quarter Pounder with Cheese, a McDonald's menu item
- Queens Park Centre, in England
- Queen's Privy Council for Canada
- QueryPerformanceCounter, an API for the High Precision Event Timer, a hardware timer used in personal computers
- Quaid e azam public college, in Gujranwala Pakistan
- Quantity Per Container, a packing efficiency metric used in production logistics of manufacturing
