= California, Buckinghamshire =

Hamlet in Buckinghamshire, England

Coordinates: 51.813066°N 0.816409°W

California
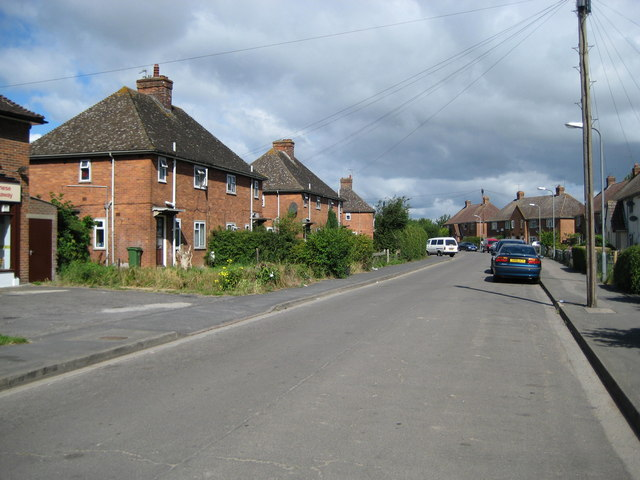
- Penn Road, California, Aylesbury

- Location within Buckinghamshire
- OS grid reference: SP8113
- Civil parish: Aylesbury
- Unitary authority: Buckinghamshire
- Ceremonial county: Buckinghamshire
- Region: South East
- Country: England
- Sovereign state: United Kingdom
- Post town: AYLESBURY
- Postcode district: HP21
- Dialling code: 01296
- Police: Thames Valley
- Fire: Buckinghamshire
- Ambulance: South Central
- UK Parliament: Aylesbury

California is an area to the south side of Aylesbury town centre in Buckinghamshire, England.

== Etymology ==
The area is presumably named after the U.S. state of California.

== History ==
The history of the area goes back many centuries. Before it became California the area was known as Cooks Close and was part of the grounds of the 14th century Grey Friars monastery. Around the year 1849 some of the land was sold off and split into gardens. This area was named California. It wasn't long before plots were built on and with the coming of the Wycombe Railway in 1863 many railway workers houses appeared on the southeastern side of California. This block of houses included a beerhouse called the Golden Sovereign and later the Silver Bugle.

=== Hazell, Watson and Viney ===
In 1867, printing and publishing firm, Hazell, Watson and Viney, opened an inkworks in a disused silk mill in California. In 1878, this was moved to purpose built premises on the Tring Road (opposite the current site of Tesco), which closed in 1952.

=== 20th century ===
By the early 1920s Aylesbury had grown such that it was necessary to start building houses on the site of Southcourt (the other side of California from Aylesbury), and so California and the associated farmlands that surrounded it became part of Aylesbury town. Eventually the farmlands themselves were built on, though some of the railway cottages still stand today.

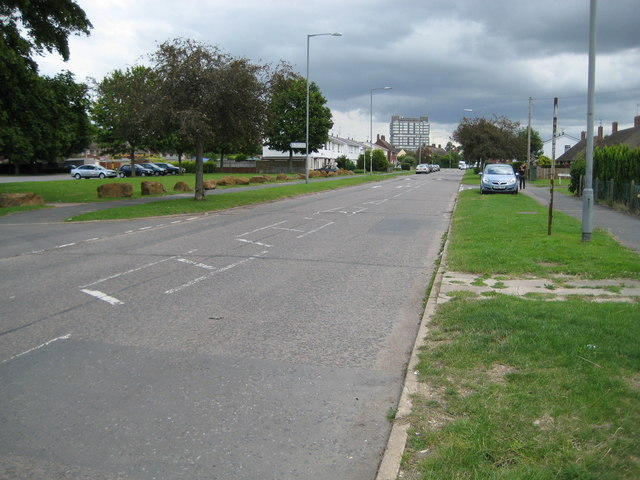
Looking north east towards the council offices, from Prebendal Avenue

In 1924, the Bishop of Oxford transferred lands owned in California into the hands of the Municipal Borough of Aylesbury, which in 1929 was partially used in the construction of a new church and parsonage house, which is currently located on Penn Road.

=== 21st century ===
The site was home to the "California Industrial Estate" until 2005 when it was demolished to make way for a new housing estate, renamed the "Grand Central" due to its proximity to the centre of Aylesbury. As of November 2006 the building work has nearly finished and it is likely that the hamlet will be forgotten as it has been completely swamped by Aylesbury's development.

== Facilities ==
=== Education ===
- Aylesbury College
- Sir Henry Floyd Grammar School
- Oak Green School
- Bambino Community Nursery
- Pebble Brook School

=== Religion ===
- Southcourt Baptist Church
- Southcourt Mosque

=== Other ===
- The Railway Club, a social club
- Southcourt Community Centre
