= Pebble Brook School =

Location
- Churchill Avenue; Aylesbury, Buckinghamshire, HP21 8LZ; England
- Coordinates: 51°48′42″N 0°49′31″W

Information
- Type: Community special School
- Motto: Bringing out the best in everyone
- Local authority: Buckinghamshire
- Department for Education URN: 110576 Tables
- Ofsted: Reports
- Headteacher: David Miller
- Gender: Coeducational
- Age: 11 to 19
- Enrolment: 152
- Website: https://www.pebblebrookschool.org.uk/

Pebble Brook School is a co-educational special school in Aylesbury, Buckinghamshire. It is a community school, which takes children from the age of 11 through to the age of 19. The school has approximately 152 pupils.

The school caters for secondary school and Sixth Form aged children with moderate learning difficulties.
