= New Zealand, Buckinghamshire =

Coordinates: 51.825435°N 0.814343°W

New Zealand
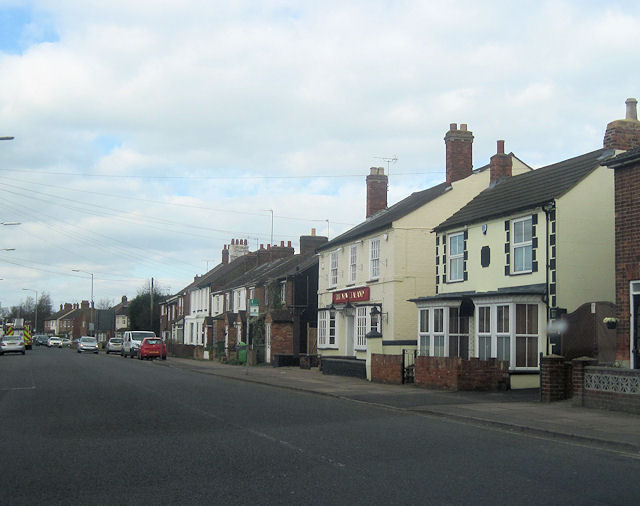

- Location within Buckinghamshire
- OS grid reference: SP8114
- Civil parish: Aylesbury
- Unitary authority: Buckinghamshire
- Ceremonial county: Buckinghamshire
- Region: South East
- Country: England
- Sovereign state: United Kingdom
- Post town: AYLESBURY
- Postcode district: HP19
- Dialling code: 01296
- Police: Thames Valley
- Fire: Buckinghamshire
- Ambulance: South Central
- UK Parliament: Aylesbury

New Zealand is a hamlet in the civil parish of Aylesbury, Buckinghamshire, England, on the A413 heading out to the north of Aylesbury town centre. It gained its name from a breed of cow that was supposedly farmed there. It has been swallowed up by the urban growth of Aylesbury, but a pub of the same name remains.
