= The PACE Centre =

The PACE Centre, Aylesbury
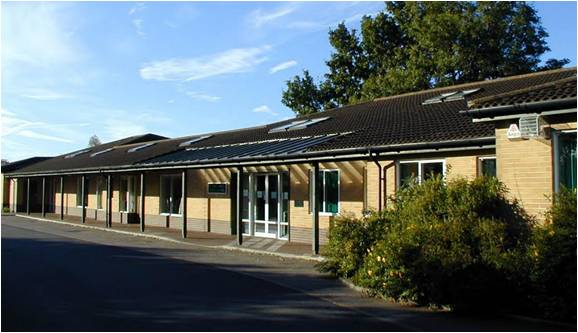

Location
- Coventon Road; Aylesbury, Buckinghamshire, HP19 9JL; England; 51.825906°N 0.828130°W

Information
- Type: Private special school
- Established: 1990
- Founder: Heather Last
- Department for Education URN: 131462 Tables
- Ofsted: Reports
- Chief Executive: Ian Sansbury
- Staff: 100 (approx.)
- Age: 0 to 18
- Enrolment: 108 (including pre-school children and those on other schools' rolls)
- Affiliation: CEPEG (http://www.cepeg.org.uk)
- Website: http://www.thepacecentre.org

The PACE Centre is a UK-registered charity and special school based in Aylesbury, Buckinghamshire, UK. It helps children and young people with motor disorders, such as cerebral palsy.

== Background ==
PACE was founded by Heather Last in 1990 based on the principles of conductive education. It is a parent-led initiative, with 5 children and 3 staff and initially based in converted farm buildings in Dinton, Buckinghamshire. It moved into its first purpose-built facilities in Coventon Road, Aylesbury in 1997, funded mainly through the generosity of the Philip Green Memorial Trust

In 2009, a special PACE unit at the Heritage House secondary school in Chesham was constituted on initiative of a Buckinghamshire parent Saera Carter, staffed by teachers from the PACE Centre to support four severely disabled teenagers during their secondary school education including her disabled son. It is funded and supported by the local authority.

PACE now operates across two different sites - Coventon Road and The Bradbury Campus. The Bradbury Campus is a converted former car dealership into an Early Years Centre that will work with babies and very young children with cerebral palsy. The first brick for the new centre was laid in April 2013 and the first building ready for occupation in January 2014.

== Activities and strategy ==
The PACE approach is based on specialist intensive learning programmes, based on the principles and practice of conductive education and augmented by a range of other educational and therapeutic approaches, notably Sensory Integration, Bobath and augmentative and alternative communication strategies

Each year the Middle Aged Men in Lycra (MAMIL) cycling club take part in a long-range cycle challenge to raise money for the PACE Centre. So far they have raised over £500,000. In October 2013 the company building the PACE Centre's new Early Years Centre led a 'flag relay' around towns in Buckinghamshire, hoping to raise £5000 for the charity.
