= Greg Day (playwright) =

British playwright

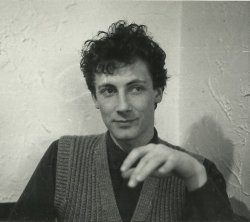
- Day in the 1980s
- Born: Aylesbury, England
- Occupation: Writer
- Years active: 1983-2001

Greg Day (born 1957) is a playwright who created several radio and stage plays between 1983 and the present day. His 1983 play The Arrangement was described as "the most disturbing bedsitcom since Polanski's The Tenant" by Time Out magazine.

== Stage plays ==
Day's first play, The Rocking Chair, was performed at the Fountains Abbey pub theatre in Paddington, and directed by Murray Shelmerdine. The two-hander revolves around Gary, a reclusive would-be writer, whose peace of mind is rudely interrupted by a new neighbour, who starts off making unwelcome advances. When he tries to borrow Gary's rocking chair in which to commit suicide, the play develops into a two-edged study of selfishness. Subsequently, adapted for radio, it aired on BBC Radio Four's Thirty Minute Theatre in 1983, directed by David Johnston and featuring John Rye and Richard Huw.

Day's 1984 play Tenderhooks follows the lives of three flatmates fixated on the same woman, and explored the "surrealism of unprivate lives". Although never produced as a stand-alone play, Tenderhooks was later staged as part of Changing Rooms at the Odyssey Theatre, an umbrella title for three of Day's plays - The Rocking Chair, Tenderhooks and The Arrangement, each one examining games of sex and power in "bedsit land". The plays were directed by David Robson.

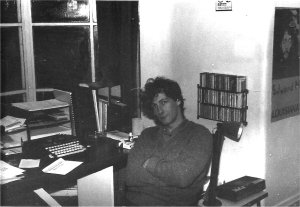
Day in his study in the 1980s

The 1984 production Behind The Clouds explored the "cloudy" personal life of Socrates, ending with his trial for seducing young men, in particular Alcibiades. The play explored the power struggles and intrigues of ancient Athens.

Day's 1986 play Bust is on the subject of the gender gap, and traces a young man's journey into womanhood - a situation which places him on the front line in 'the battle of the sexes'. In 1991 it was performed in German as Titten at the Theater Chambinzky in Wurzberg. After being rewritten and retitled as Stripped the play was performed at London's Riverside Studios in 1998, centring on Leslie and Zoe, an American couple visiting London. After a row that leads to them splitting up, Leslie starts to realise that everyone believes him to be a woman. What follows is a struggle for sexual identity and the forming of new kinds of relationships. Kevin Day described it as a "genuinely black comedy". Bust and Stripped were both directed by Tony Craven.

== Select reviews ==
- Camden Advertiser, 15 February 1983
- Hampstead & Highgate Express, 11 February 1983
- Ms London, Nov 7 1986
- Volker Muller-Veitl, Volksblatt, 28 May 1991
- Independent On Sunday, 1996
- Media Guardian, 5 May 1997
- Daily Express, 12 Oct, 1998
- The Times, Imogen Edward-Jones, 'Arty Animal', 24 Oct 1998
- Hammersmith Gazette, 23 Oct 1998
- Westminster & City Mail, 3 July 1998
- Hammersmith, Fulham & Chiswick Times, 3 July 1998
- The Stage (TV Diary), 29 April 1999
