= Prebendal Farm, Aylesbury =

Coordinates: 51.814416°N 0.829110°W

Prebendal Farm
- Location within Buckinghamshire
- OS grid reference: SP8013
- Civil parish: Aylesbury
- Unitary authority: Buckinghamshire
- Ceremonial county: Buckinghamshire
- Region: South East
- Country: England
- Sovereign state: United Kingdom
- Post town: AYLESBURY
- Postcode district: HP19
- Dialling code: 01296
- Police: Thames Valley
- Fire: Buckinghamshire
- Ambulance: South Central
- UK Parliament: Aylesbury

Prebendal Farm is a housing estate in Aylesbury, Buckinghamshire, England. It is located to the west of the town, bordered by the Oxford Road, the railway and the Bearbrook (a minor stream that rises in Bedgrove and is a tributary of the River Thame).

Prebendal Farm was originally a farm on the outskirts of the old town of Aylesbury, and was one of the primary locations where the Aylesbury duck industry was developed. The owner at that time was John Kersley Fowler who was the proposer of Benjamin Disraeli for Member of Parliament for Buckinghamshire.

The new housing estate was built in the early 1970s and the major road through the estate was named after J. K. Fowler (above). Since then the estate has seen a period of decline to the extent that it is now recognised as one of the most relatively deprived areas of the district. This led to the Coldharbour ward (of which Prebendal Farm is a part) being the pilot Neighbourhood Policing initiative for the Thames Valley Police area and has subsequently led to the formation of a Residents' Group and youth club on the estate.

== Education ==
Bearbrook Combined School is a mixed primary school in Prebendal Farm.

It is a community school, which takes children from the age of 4 through to the age of 11. The school has approximately 350 pupils.

== Transport ==
Prebendal Farm is provided with a regular bus service by RedRoseTravel. The Silver Rider service operates between the hours of 0600 and 2300 and operates to Fairford Leys and Aylesbury Town Centre.
