= Haydon Hill =

Coordinates: 51.826050°N 0.845365°W

Haydon Hill Estate, Aylesbury
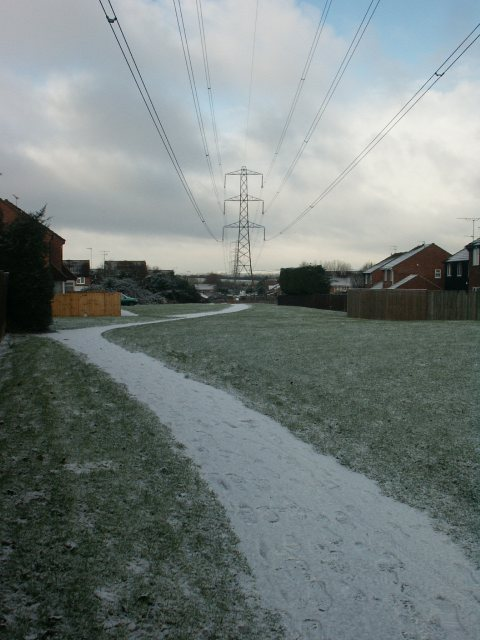
- Looking north from Scott End, December 2005

- Location within Buckinghamshire
- Population: 1,294
- OS grid reference: SP799146
  - London: 41.6 m
- Unitary authority: Buckinghamshire
- Ceremonial county: Buckinghamshire
- Region: South East
- Country: England
- Sovereign state: United Kingdom
- Post town: Aylesbury
- Postcode district: HP19
- Dialling code: 01296
- Police: Thames Valley
- Fire: Buckinghamshire
- Ambulance: South Central
- UK Parliament: Aylesbury

Haydon Hill is part of the town of Aylesbury, England. The neighbourhood is to the north of Aylesbury, Buckinghamshire. It occupies the area to the north of the town and to the west of the A41, Bicester Road.

The estate was built during the 1970s and 1980s as part of a major housing expansion.

Although mostly housing, Haydon Hill has a community centre on Dickens Way. It is a compact venue for smaller functions having a capacity for 100 people dancing and 50 people if seated. It has a small kitchen and access for people with disabilities.

== History ==
The land is believed to have formerly been mainly farmland. The word ‘Haydon’ may mean ‘an enclosure’ or ‘a hedged in enclosure’, although the area has had the name written in variations such as 'Haydon', 'Heydon', 'Heyden' and 'Heydone'

The earliest record of any human activity in the area was found in 1978 when the estate was under construction. A large amount of pottery, three pieces of burned bone and a fragment of a bronze ligula (small Roman spoon) were found in the spoil cast up from a pipe trench being laid. The Ligula and pottery dates from the early Iron Age to 5th-century Roman.

During the Roman period Akeman Street (which was a Roman road from London to Cirencester) passed through the eastern boundary of the estate. Akeman Street closely follows the line of the A41, Bicester Road. Most Roman roads were raised on a slight causeway, especially where they crossed wet ground, in order to provide drainage. This low bank or agger can often be traced even if the surfacing material (rammed chalk, gravel, iron slag or the like) has long since been denuded or covered by vegetation. At Haydon Hill there was a distinct Agger visible at the location of Haydon Hill Farm.

Also on the estate Roman finds were made including a quantity of bones and large amounts of pottery found in 1897 and large amounts of pottery, spindle whorls etc. in 1923. In 1954 large amounts of pottery, a 3rd-century coin, spearheads and horseshoes. These finds were located on the top of the hill, on the western edge of the estate along the course of Akeman Street and on the eastern edge where the Haydon Hill Railway Cutting is located. There is to this date though no apparent or other evidence to indicate a specific habitation site.

In 1976 a 2nd-century Roman Cremation burial was found during trenching for the water mains when the estate was under construction.

The earliest reference of a property in Haydon Hill is in the Domesday Book of 1315. It makes reference to Heydone Mill which formed part of the Manor of Herdewelle (now the Manor of Hartwell in Stone). A document of 1341 mentions property 'abutting on the water from Haydon Mill'.

In 1554 the limits of the borough of Aylesbury as recited in the charter of incorporation were from Glasyers Bridge (in Walton, Buckinghamshire) to Stannebridge (Stonebridge on the A41), in width from Holmansbridge (on the Buckingham road) to Walbridge (on the road to Thame, Oxfordshire). The Stannebridge or Stonebridge described is the crossing on the A41 over the River Thame on the far eastern boundary of the Haydon Hill estate. Visitors to Quarrendon (village) would have crossed the stannebridge which was a key vantage-point. Ahead he would have seen the west end of the church, the new almshouses, the formal gardens to the right, the great house straight ahead, and the warren on the skyline beyond. Looking up and down stream he would have seen sheep and cattle grazing the rich pasture that was the source of Henry Lee’s wealth.

The current Haydon Mill is a Grade II watermill built in 1834 which is now disused. The mill is believed to have ceased working in 1928. The mill is a red and yellow brick building with a hipped slate roof and projecting eaves. It is three storeys tall, has three bays (bay meaning a division of an elevation or interior space as defined by regular vertical features such as arches, columns or windows). There is a lean-to first storey extension on the right hand side of the building. The wheel has been dismantled but some machinery remains.

== Administration ==
Haydon Hill is within the Quarrendon ward of Aylesbury Vale local authority in the South East region. Aylesbury Town Council is the parish council.
