= Friars Square =

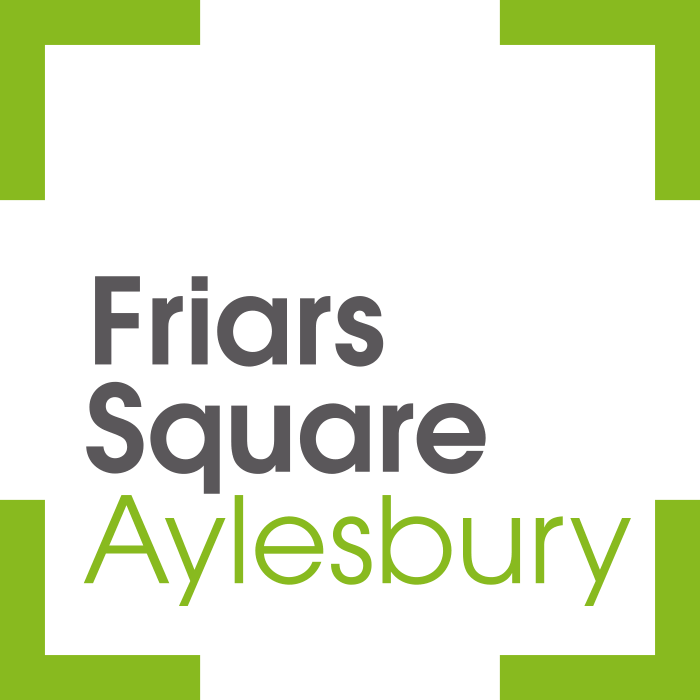

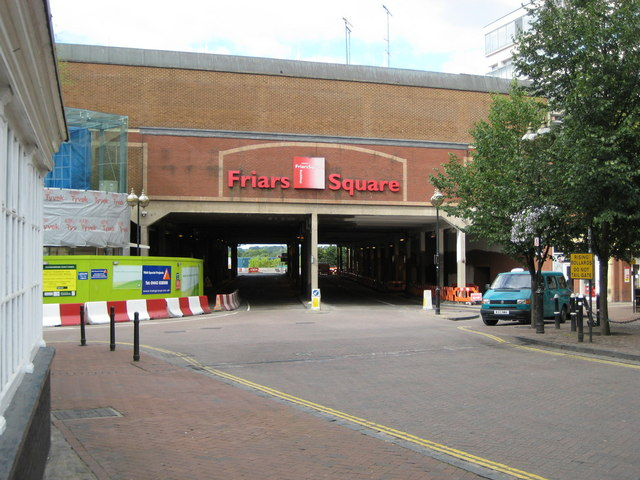
- Entrance to the bus station
- Location: Aylesbury, England
- Coordinates: 51.8150°N 0.8133°W
- Opened: 1967 (original Friars Square); 1993 (new Friars Square)
- Manager: Andy Margieson
- Owner: Buckinghamshire Council
- Architect: Stanley Bragg Architects
- Num. of stores: 49
- Num. of anchor tenants: 1 (House of Fraser)
- Floor area: 283,000 square feet (26,300 m^{2})
- Website: friarssquareshopping.com

Friars Square is a shopping centre located in the town centre of Aylesbury. The landlord is the Buckinghamshire Council, and managed by Savills.

The shopping centre is a mixed-use development, incorporating elements of a previous shopping centre development of the same name. Friars Square includes over 60 shops and restaurants, offices, 400-space multi-storey car park and bus station. The Cloisters indoor market was closed in 2012. to make store space for H&M and space for a gym The centre is anchored by House of Fraser.

== History ==
The original Friars Square (or Friar's Square) was created in the 1960s as the Aylesbury Town Centre Redevelopment. It transformed the south-west part of the town centre including the Market Square and Silver Street areas. The first phase opened in 1967, it included a number of shops in an open-air pedestrian only area, and included a new location for the town's market. The second phase which included Woolworths and the bus station opened in 1969.

The Cadena cafe, which later became a Wimpy, was housed in a modern architectural pavilion over the open market.

The current shopping centre was formally opened in 1993 at a cost of £70m, following the closure and extension of the previous town centre development of the same name. The redevelopment was designed by Stanley Bragg Architects. The large Woolworth building was integrated into the development, to house the new anchor store (now House of Fraser) and the library.

In 2007 the centre was sold by F&C Property Asset Management to Multiplex. In 2011, ownership passed to Royal Bank of Scotland's West Register asset division, as the newly merged Brookfield Multiplex subsequently moved out of the UK retail market following its acquisition of Multiplex. RBS had previously provided the debt for Multiplex to buy Friars Square for £89.5 million.

In 2012, the vacant office building was proposed to be converted into 50 apartments.

In January 2013, a branch of clothing chain H&M opened in Friars Square, on the site of the old madhouse clothing store. The HMV store which was closed on 11 February 2012 office shoes now occupies the store. In September 2013, a branch of rival clothing chain Topshop opened in Friars Square, in a newly constructed part in the middle of the main shopping mall. That closed down, and JD Sports now occupies the space.

In October 2017, a branch of Smiggle specialising in stationery products opened.

In June 2018 the Friars Square security team won Security Team of the Year title at the annual SCEPTRE Awards at the Dorchester in London.
