= Royal Buckinghamshire Hospital =

The Royal Buckinghamshire Hospital
- Buckinghamshire Group
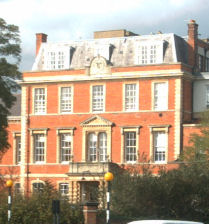
- Royal Buckinghamshire Hospital

- Shown in Buckinghamshire

Geography
- Location: Aylesbury,, Buckinghamshire, England, United Kingdom
- Coordinates: 51.8207°N 0.8160°W

Organisation
- Care system: Private
- Type: Specialist

Services
- Emergency department: No Accident & Emergency
- Beds: 22
- Speciality: Spinal cord injury, Stroke, Acquired Brain Injury

History
- Founded: 1832

Links
- Website: www.royalbucks.co.uk
- Lists: Hospitals in England

The Royal Buckinghamshire Hospital (colloquially called the Royal Bucks) is a private hospital in Aylesbury, Buckinghamshire. It is a Grade II listed building.

== History ==
The hospital was established, by adding new wings to an 18th-century country house, in 1832. The facility was extensively remodeled to a design by David Brandon using a pavilion layout which was heavily influenced by Florence Nightingale through her brother-in-law, Sir Harry Verney of Claydon House. She said that "it will be the most beautiful hospital in England." The new hospital was opened as the Buckinghamshire General Infirmary in 1862.

It is thought that the hospital became "Royal" after the Prince of Wales received treatment there in the late 19th century. A new wing, the foundation stone for which was laid by Lord Rothschild, followed in 1905.

Following the expansion of the Stoke Mandeville Hospital nearby, the Royal Buckinghamshire Hospital joined the National Health Service as a maternity hospital in 1948. It became a private hospital in 1994 and, after acquisition by Affinity Care Homes and an extensive subsequent refurbishment, it reopened as a facility for the treatment of patients with spinal cord, acquired brain injury and other neurological conditions in 2013.

In January 2023, it was announced that the Royal Buckinghamshire Hospital would undergo an extensive refurbishment and be acquired by the Akessa Healthcare Group along with The Foscote Hospital and 107 Harley Street in January 2023.

== See also ==
- List of hospitals in England
