= Aylesbury bus station =

Bus station in Aylesbury, England

Coordinates: 51.8147°N 0.8138°W

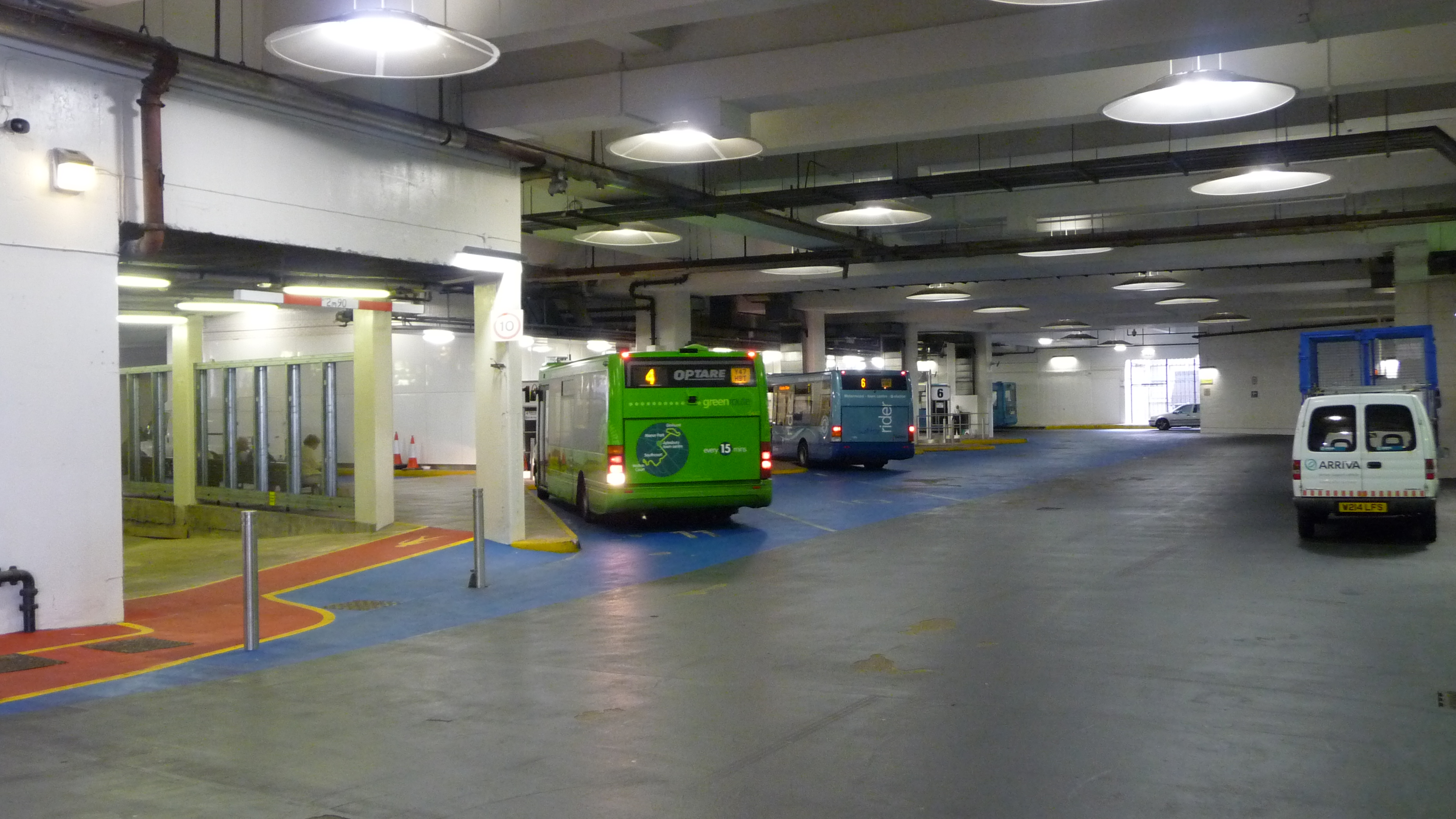
Interior of the bus station

Aylesbury bus station is a bus station in Aylesbury. The bus station has been noted for its unwelcoming environment, being situated under Friars Square shopping centre. The local council have stated it is looking at a long-term solution for the bus station.
