= Aylesbury =

County town of Buckinghamshire, England

Coordinates: 51.8168°N 0.8124°W

- Town, civil parish
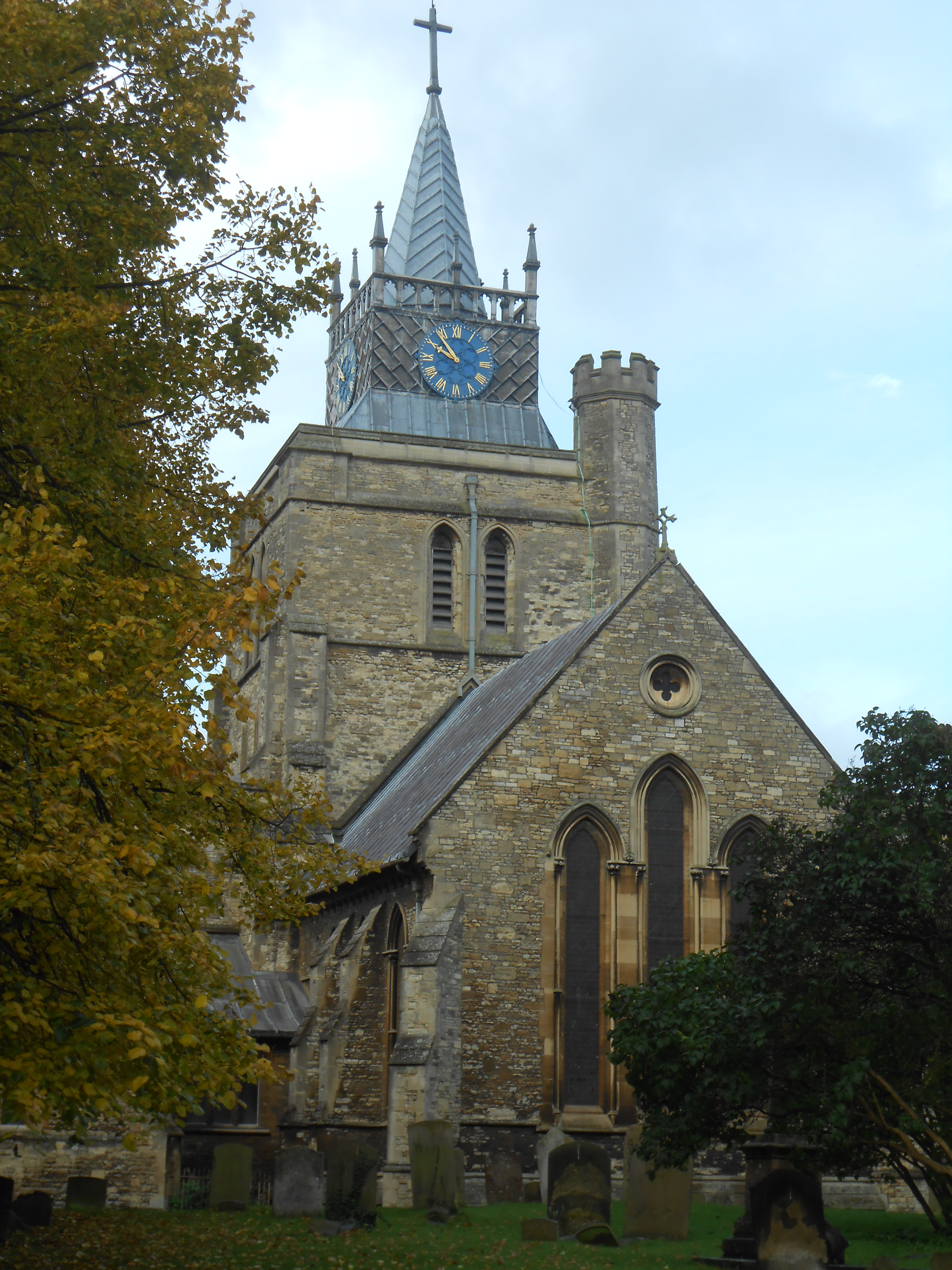
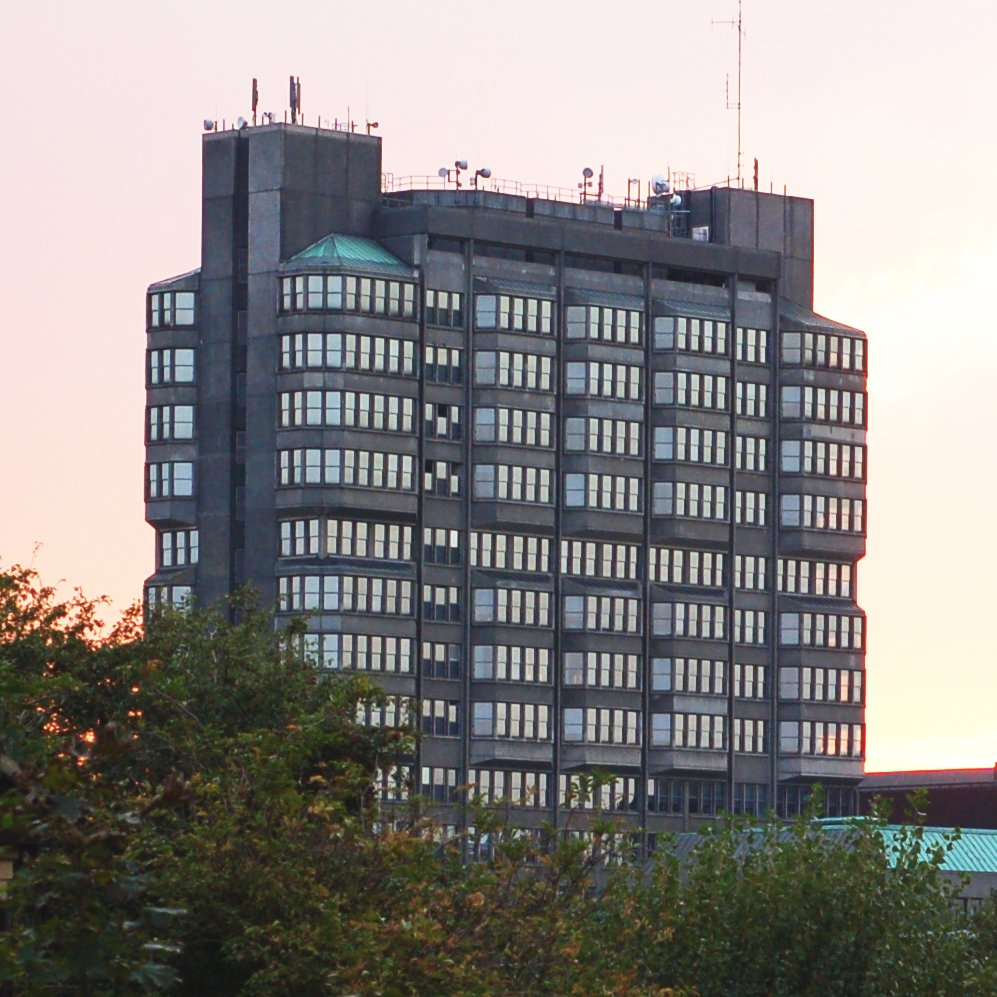
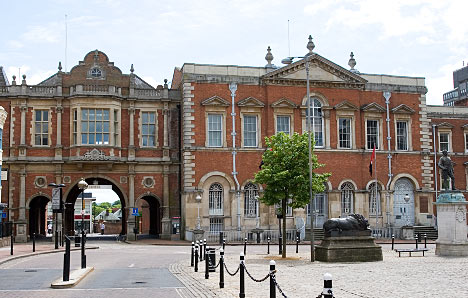
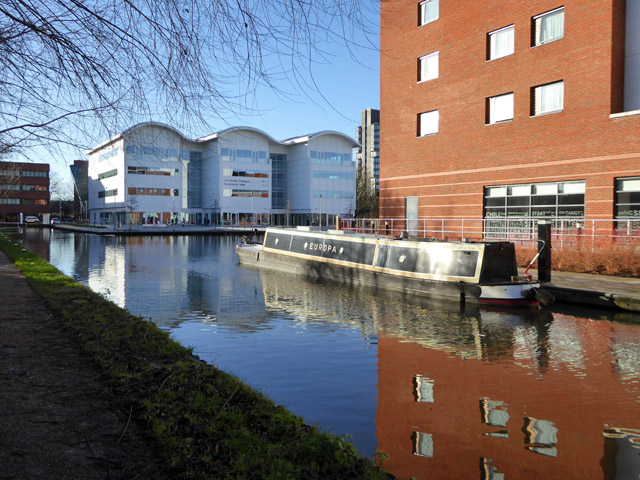
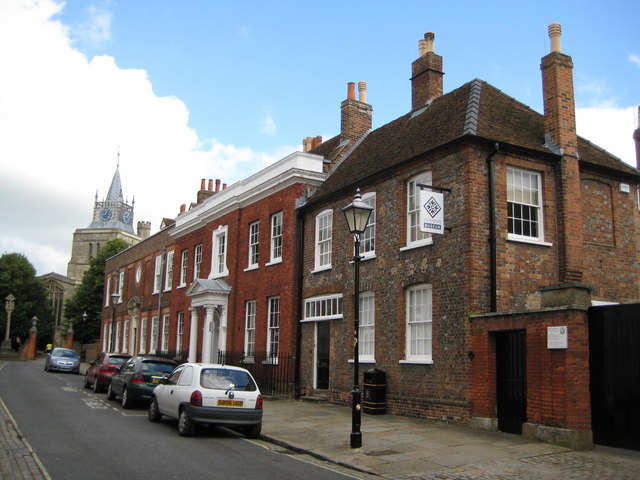
- St Mary's County Hall Aylesbury Crown Court Aylesbury Arm County Museum

- Location within Buckinghamshire
- Interactive map showing Aylesbury civil parish boundary
- Population: 63,273 (2021)
- OS grid reference: SP818138
  - London: 36 miles (58 km)
- Civil parish: Aylesbury
- Unitary authority: Buckinghamshire Council
- Ceremonial county: Buckinghamshire
- Region: South East
- Country: England
- Sovereign state: United Kingdom
- Post town: Aylesbury
- Postcode district: HP18-HP21
- Dialling code: 01296
- Police: Thames Valley
- Fire: Buckinghamshire
- Ambulance: South Central
- UK Parliament: Aylesbury

Aylesbury (/ˈeɪlzbəri/ AYLZ-bər-ee or /ˈɛlzbri/ ELLZ-bree) is the county town of Buckinghamshire, England. It is located midway between High Wycombe and Milton Keynes. In 2021, Aylesbury civil parish had a population of 63,273, while its urban area had a population of 87,950; the housing target for the town is set to grow, with 16,000 homes to be built by 2033. It is home to the Roald Dahl Children's Gallery and the Waterside Theatre; the town's Queens Park Arts Centre received the King's Award for Voluntary Service.

== Etymology ==
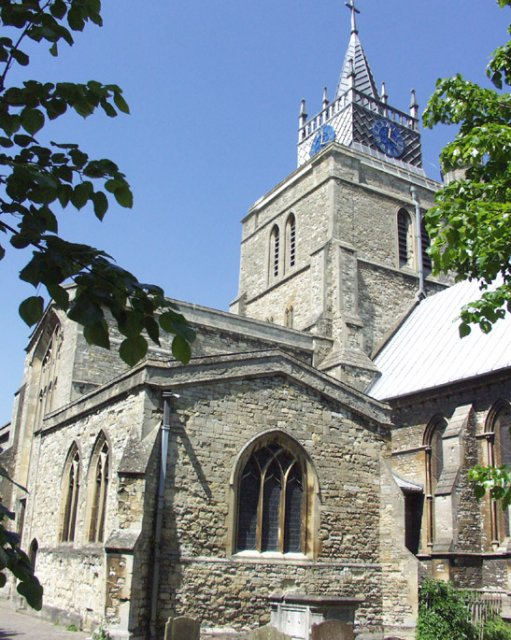
St Mary the Virgin's Church, Aylesbury's parish church

The town name is of Old English origin. It is first recorded in the form Æglesburg in the Anglo-Saxon Chronicle, a text which took its present form in the later ninth century. The word Ægles is a personal name in the genitive case, meaning "Ægel's" and burg means "fortification". Thus the name once meant "Fort of Ægel", though who Ægel was is not recorded. Nineteenth-century speculation that the name contained the Welsh word eglwys meaning "a church" (from Latin ecclesia) has been discredited.

== History ==
Excavations in the town centre in 1985 found an Iron Age hillfort dating from the early 4th century BCE.

The Anglo-Saxon Chronicle portrays Aylesbury as being captured from the Britons by one Cuthwulf following the Battle of Bedcanford; the historicity of this event is doubtful, but the portrayal at least indicates that in the early Middle Ages the settlement was thought to be of some strategic importance. During the early medieval period, Aylesbury became a major market town and the burial place of Saint Osgyth, whose shrine attracted pilgrims. The town was a royal manor, with eight attached hundreds in 1086, and some historians have supposed that it was already a royal manor before the Norman conquest. Some lands here were granted by William the Conqueror to citizens upon the tenure that the owners should provide straw for the monarch's bed, sweet herbs for his chamber, and two green geese and three eels for his table, whenever he should visit Aylesbury.

The town includes an Early English parish church, St. Mary the Virgin's, which has many later additions.

In 1450, a religious institution called the Guild of St Mary was founded in Aylesbury by John Kemp, Archbishop of York. Known popularly as the Guild of Our Lady, it became a meeting place for local dignitaries and a hotbed of political intrigue. The guild was influential in the outcome of the Wars of the Roses. Its premises at the Chantry are extant, although the site in Church Street now used mainly for retail.

Aylesbury was declared the new county town of Buckinghamshire in 1529 by King Henry VIII. Aylesbury Manor was among the many properties belonging to Thomas Boleyn, the father of Anne Boleyn, and it is rumoured that the change was made by the King to curry favour with the family. (Note: Previously the county town of Buckinghamshire was Buckingham) The plague decimated the population in 1603/4.

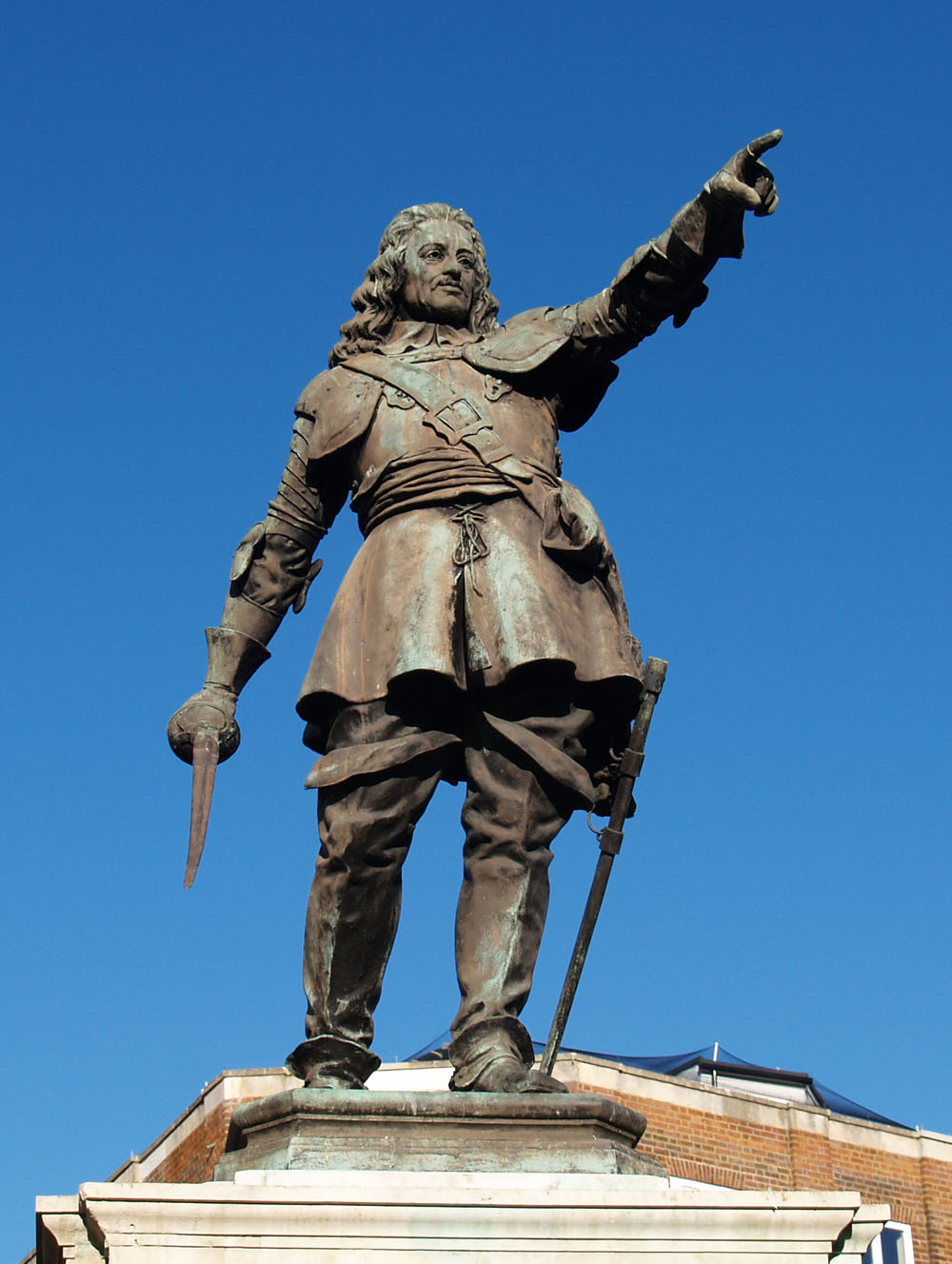
Statue of John Hampden in Market Square

The town played a large part in the English Civil War when it became a stronghold for the Parliamentarian forces, like many market towns a nursing-ground of Puritan sentiment and, in 1642, the Battle of Aylesbury was fought and won by the Parliamentarians. Its proximity to Great Hampden, home of John Hampden has made of Hampden a local hero; his silhouette was used on the emblem of Aylesbury Vale District Council and his statue stands prominently in the town centre. Aylesbury-born composer, Rutland Boughton (1878–1960), possibly inspired by the statue of John Hampden, created a symphony based on Oliver Cromwell.

On 18 March 1664, Robert Bruce, 2nd Earl of Elgin in the Peerage of Scotland was created 1st Earl of Ailesbury (Note: With subsidiary titles in the Peerage of England: Viscount Bruce, of Ampthill in the County of Bedford, and Baron Bruce, of Skelton in the County of York).

The grade II* listed Jacobean mansion of Hartwell adjoining the south-west of the town was the residence of French king Louis XVIII during his exile (1810–1814); Bourbon Street is named after the king. Louis' wife, Marie Joséphine of Savoy, died at Hartwell in 1810 and is the only French queen to have died on English soil. After her death, her body was carried first to Westminster Abbey and, one year later, to Sardinia where the Savoy King of Sardinia had withdrawn during Napoleonic occupation of Turin and Piedmont; she is buried in the Cathedral of Cagliari.

Aylesbury's heraldic crest displays the Aylesbury duck, which has been bred here since the birth of the Industrial Revolution, although only one breeder of true Aylesbury ducks, Richard Waller, remains today

The town also received international publicity in 1963 when the culprits responsible for the Great Train Robbery (1963) were tried at Aylesbury Rural District Council Offices in Walton Street and sentenced at Aylesbury Crown Court. The robbery took place at Bridego Bridge, a railway bridge at Ledburn, about 6 miles (10 km) from the town.

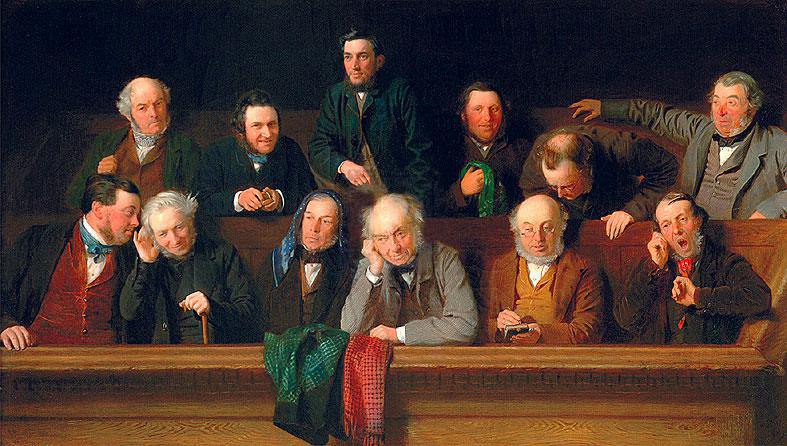
Gentlemen of the Jury, an 1861 painting by John Morgan of a jury in Aylesbury

A notable institution is Aylesbury Grammar School which was founded in 1598. The original building is now part of the County Museum buildings in Church Street and has grade II* architecture; other grammar schools now include Sir Henry Floyd Grammar School and Aylesbury High School. Other notable buildings are the King's Head Inn, (which, with the Fleece Inn at Bretforton, Worcestershire, is one of the few public houses in the country owned by the National Trust and still run as a public house) and the Queens Park Centre.

James Henry Govier, the British painter and etcher, lived at Aylesbury. He produced a number of works relating to the town, including the church, canal, Walton, Aylesbury Gaol, the King's Head Inn and views of the town during the 1940s and 1950s; examples of which can be seen in the Buckinghamshire County Museum in Aylesbury. (Note: Govier was born at Oakley and was the etching demonstrator at the Royal College of Art.)

The town is the birthplace of the Paralympic Games. During the 1948 Olympics in London, German-British neurologist Sir Ludwig Guttmann, set up a small sporting event for World War II veterans known as the World Wheelchair and Amputee Games (WWAG) at Stoke Mandeville Hospital's Rehabilitation Facility. This eventually led to the growth of the phenomenon of the modern Paralympic Games that has been held immediately after every summer Olympic Games since 1988; the WWAG was held most years at Stoke Mandeville until 1997, when it has been held in other countries and cities ever since. During the 2012 Paralympics, the official mascot was called "Mandeville".

The Rothschild Family acquired many large country estates and stately homes around and near the town. These include Waddesdon Manor in nearby Waddesdon Village, Halton House near Wendover, and Tring Park in Tring, across the border in Hertfordshire. Today, most of these properties belong to the National Trust. They have brought in increased tourism to the town and the surrounding areas.

=== Railway history ===
Railways came to the town in 1839, when the Aylesbury Railway opened from Cheddington on Robert Stephenson's London and Birmingham Railway. The Wycombe Railway (later Great Western Railway) arrived via Princes Risborough on 1 October 1863 and, on 23 September 1868, the Aylesbury and Buckingham Railway (later Metropolitan Railway) was opened from Verney Junction to almost connect a loop with the Wycombe Railway. The Metropolitan Railway (MetR) from Baker Street arrived via Amersham in 1892.

The Great Central Railway (GCR) connected from Nottingham Victoria to London Marylebone, via the MetR, in 1899. Between 1899 and 1953, Aylesbury had railway links to four London termini: Marylebone, Baker Street, Paddington and Euston. The Aylesbury Railway closed in 1953 and the MetR, which later became the Metropolitan line of the London Underground, withdrew north of Aylesbury in 1936 and withdrew from the town in 1961.

The GCR was dismantled north of the town in 1966. As a result, there were no regular passenger services north of the town until the opening of Aylesbury Vale Parkway in December 2008, which extended passenger services north-westwards. This is sited on the formerly goods-only line towards Quainton, at the point where the line crosses the A41 near Berryfields Farm on the north-west outskirts of the town, some 2.25 miles (3.62 km) north of the main Aylesbury station. This area is to be known as Berryfields, a major development area and will include park and ride facilities for Aylesbury. Only the GCR south of this new station to Marylebone is used today for regular services to London.

== Trade and industry ==
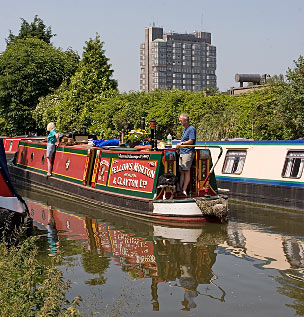
Buckinghamshire County Hall, taken from the Grand Union Canal

Traditionally, the town was a commercial centre with a market dating back to the Saxon period. This is because it was established on the main Akeman Street which became an established trade route linking London to South West England. In 1180, a jail was established in the town. (Note: The town still has a prison, although it has moved locations.)

=== 15th century ===
By 1477, flour was being ground in the town for surrounding parishes. By the modern period, this had grown into a huge established industry: the last grist mill in Aylesbury was closed in the 1990s (Hills & Partridge on the canal behind Tesco). By 1560 the manufacture of sewing needles had become a large industry in Long Crendon a village close by which was an important production centre.

=== 17th century – lace making ===
In 1672, poor children in Buckinghamshire were taught to make lace as a way to make a living. Bucks lace, as it became known, quickly became very sought after and production boomed as the lace was mainly made by poor women and children. The lace-making industry had died out by Victorian times, however, as new machine-made lace became cheaper.

In 1764, Euclid Neale opened his clockmaking workshop in Aylesbury. In the 18th century, he was one of the best clock makers in the country.

=== 19th century – canals ===
In 1814, the Aylesbury arm of the Grand Union Canal from Marsworth was opened bringing major industry to the town for the first time. At the same time, the Wendover arm was built leading to nearby Wendover.

=== 20th century – motor manufacture ===
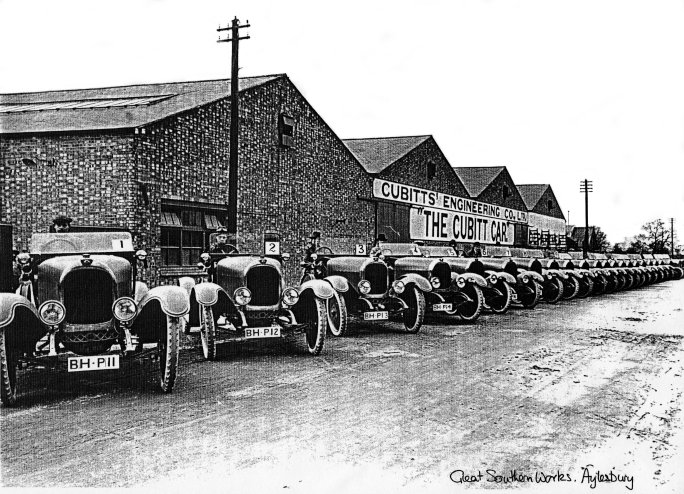
Twenty Cubitt 16/20s in c.1922 publicity image at the Cubitt car factory, Great Southern Works, on Bicester Road

From 1919 until 1925, the Cubit Engineering Works on Bicester Road was a volume manufacturer of motor vehicles. Approximately 3,000 cars were built, but a somewhat slow and heavy design could not survive the onslaught from cheap American competition. Their robust design and high ground clearance made them popular in less developed parts of the British Empire which lacked paved roads like Australia and South Africa. The works have been demolished for a housing development. The marque is commemorated by Cubitt Street (and Edge Street) which traverses the old works.

By the late 20th century, the printers and bookbinders, Hazell, Watson and Viney and the Nestlé dairy were the two main employers in the town, employing more than half the total population. These factories have long since been demolished and replaced by a Tesco supermarket, which opened in 1994, and a housing development respectively.

=== 21st century ===
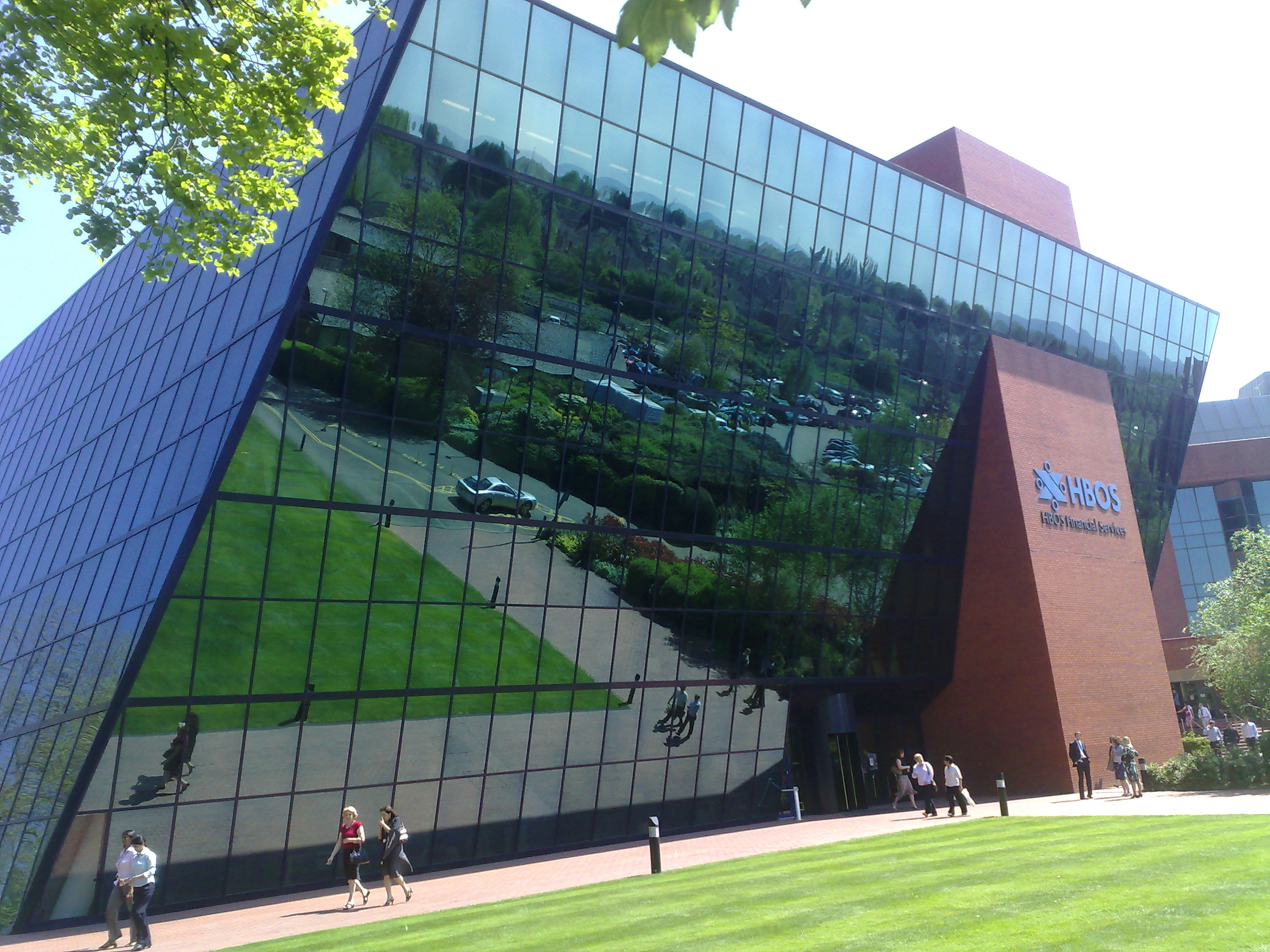
Blue Leanie, office block of Lloyds Bank

Today, the town is still a major commercial centre and the market still meets on the cobbles of the old Market Square four days a week. Hazell, Watson and Viney, along with Nestlé and US automotive parts producer TRW have gone; the last left the town in 2006. However, three major industrial and commercial centres make sure the town has one of the lowest unemployment rates in the country.

A£150 million Arla Foods megadairy opened, just off the A41 road, in nearby Aston Clinton in November 2013; it lies 3 1/2 mi (6 km) from the town centre and is a major employer in the area. Traffic improvement measures were paid for by Arla, to reduce the impact of congestion and pollution.

One of the more prominent buildings in Aylesbury is the "Blue Leanie" office block, home to Lloyds Bank. When first built, it was thought to be a potential hazard to passing motorists, due to the sun reflecting off its large mirrored surface. As a result, a line of mature trees was planted alongside the main road to prevent dazzling.

== The Aylesbury duck ==
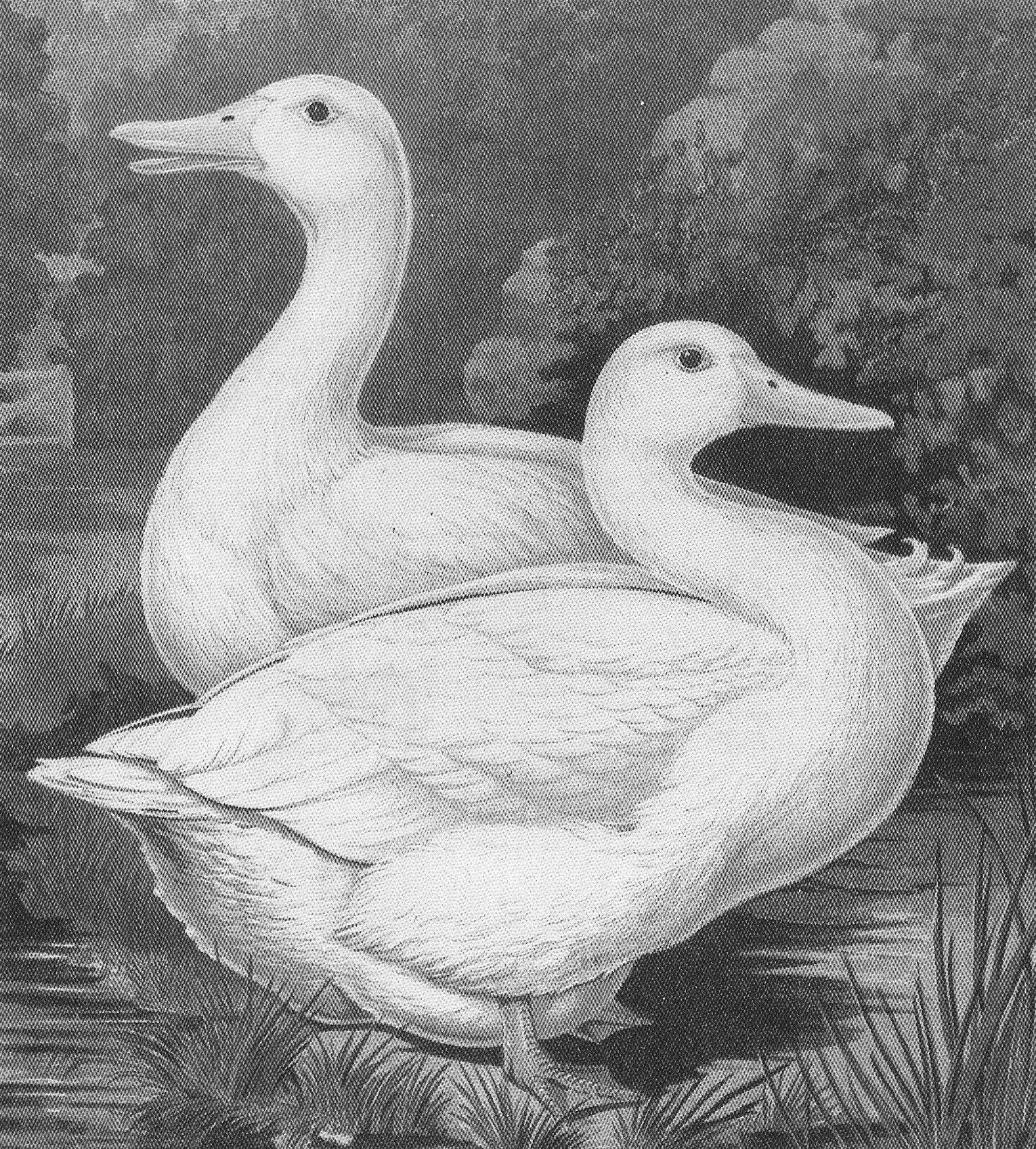
Prize-winning Aylesbury ducks from The Illustrated Book of Poultry, 1873

In the 18th century, selective breeding of white common ducks led to a white domestic duck, generally known as the English White. Since at least the 1690s, ducks had been farmed in Aylesbury and made the town known throughout England and beyond. They were bred and brought up by poor people, and sent to London by the weekly carriers. They went on to be known as the Aylesbury duck.

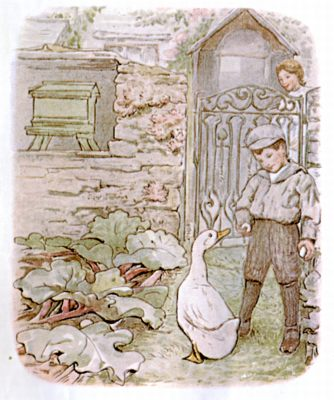
An illustration from The Tale of Jemima Puddle-Duck by Beatrix Potter, about an Aylesbury duck, is set in Cumbria

The duck business in the town went into decline in the 19th century. By the time Beatrix Potter's 1908 The Tale of Jemima Puddle-Duck caused renewed interest in the breed, the Aylesbury duck was in steep decline. The duckers of Buckinghamshire had generally failed to introduce technological improvements, such as the incubator, and inbreeding had dangerously weakened the breed. Meanwhile, the cost of duck food had risen fourfold over the 19th century and, from 1873 onwards, competition from Pekin and Pekin cross ducks was undercutting Aylesbury ducks at the marketplace. The First World War devastated the remaining duckers of Buckinghamshire.

By the end of the war, small-scale duck rearing in the Aylesbury Vale had vanished, with duck raising dominated by a few large duck farms. Shortages of duck food in the Second World War caused further disruption to the industry and almost all duck farming in the Aylesbury Vale ended. A 1950 Aylesbury Duckling Day campaign, to boost the reputation of the Aylesbury duck, had little effect; by the end of the 1950s, the last significant farms had closed, other than a single flock in Chesham owned by Mr L.T. Waller and, by 1966, there were no duck breeders remaining in the town. As of 2021, the Waller family's farm in Chesham remains in business, the last surviving flock of pure Aylesbury meat ducks in the country. There are still many hobbyists who keep the breed.

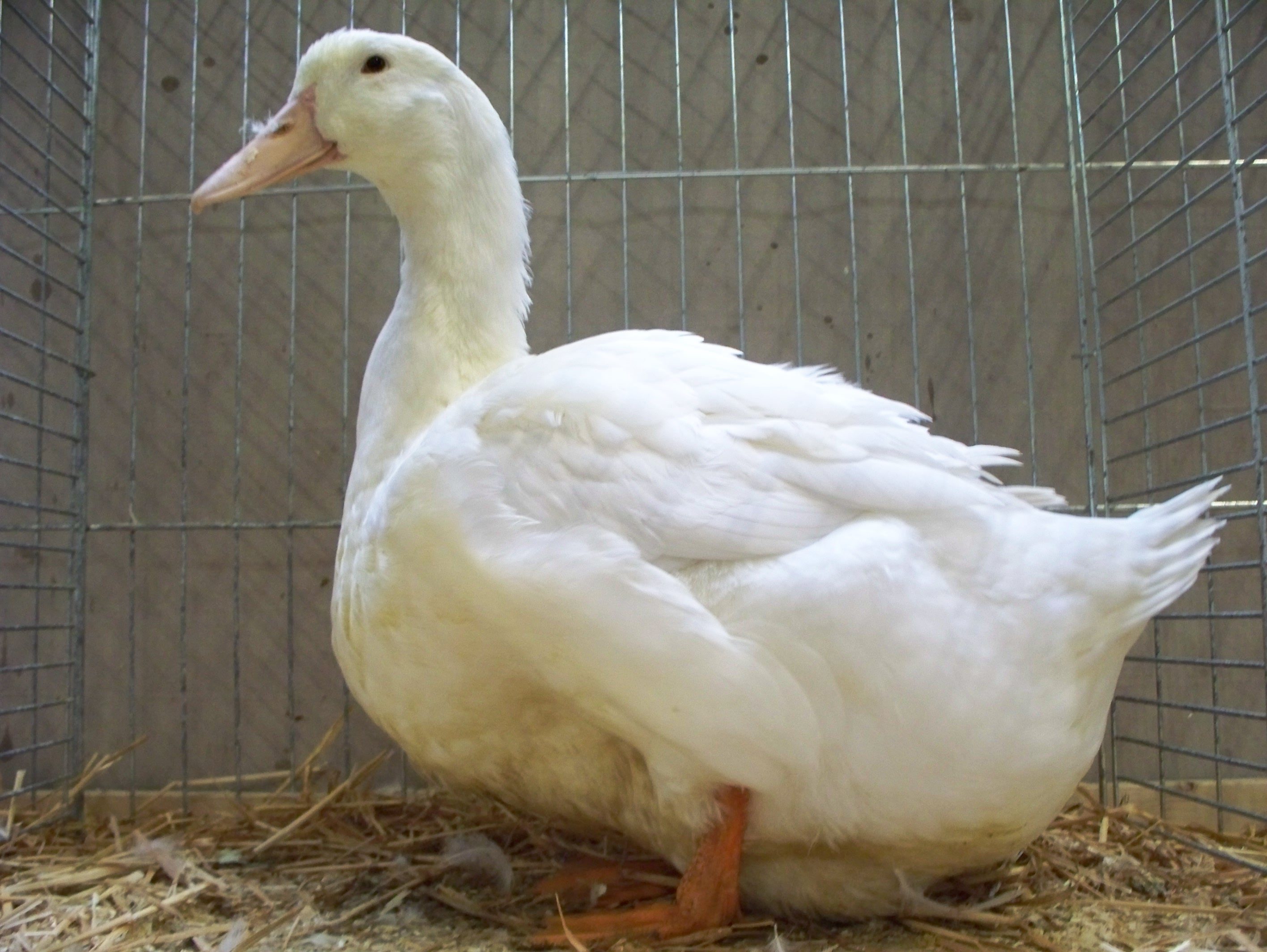
The Aylesbury duck is considered a rare breed

It remains a symbol of the town. Aylesbury United F.C. are nicknamed "The Ducks" and include an Aylesbury duck on their club badge; the town's coat of arms includes a duck and plaited straw, representing the two historic industries of the town. The Aylesbury Brewery Company, now defunct, featured the duck as its logo; an example of which can still be seen at the Britannia pub. Duck Farm Court is a shopping area of modern Aylesbury located near the historic hamlet of California, close to one of the main breeding grounds for ducks in the town. There were two pubs in the town with the name "The Duck" in recent years: one in Bedgrove, that has since been demolished, and one in Jackson Road that has recently been renamed.

== Geography ==
=== Neighbourhoods ===
Housing estates in or neighbourhoods of the modern Aylesbury include:

- Bedgrove
- Berryfields
- Broughton
- Buckingham Park
- Coppice
- Crown Leys
- Elm Farm
- Elmhurst
- Fairford Leys
- Haydon Hill
- Hawkslade Farm
- Kingsbrook
- Mandeville Estate
- Mandeville Park
- Meadowcroft
- Prebendal Farm
- Quarrendon
- Queens Park
- Shakespeare Estate
- Southcourt
- Stoke Farm
- Stoke Grange
- Walton Court
- Watermead
- The Willows.

Distinct whole areas that have a notably high property price in the town are Bedgrove, the conservation area around St. Mary's Church and Queens Park, particularly facing onto the canal.

=== Farms and hamlets ===
Aylesbury has also been extended to completely surround the hamlets and former farms at:

- Bedgrove
- California
- Fairford Leys
- New Zealand
- Prebendal Farm
- Quarrendon
- Turnfurlong
- Walton.

=== Future developments ===
Anticipated developments are expected to raise the urban population of Aylesbury, from its current approximation of 75,000, to over 100,000 between 2018 and 2023.

=== Elevations, soil and geology ===
Aylesbury lies immediately south-east of the upper River Thame, that flows past Thame to Dorchester on Thames. It is partly sited on the two northernmost outcrops of Portland stone in England (Note: "This stone has above: freely draining lime-rich loamy soils" which forms 3.7% of English soil according to the Soilscape source) and is bisected by a small stream, Bear Brook; this gives a relatively prominent position in relation to the terrain of all near, lower, fields and suburbs, which have largely slowly permeable Oxford Clay and Kimmeridge Clay soils. (Note: Specifically described in the source national map as "Slowly permeable seasonally wet slightly acid but base-rich loamy and clayey soils" (therefore of medium fertility), which forms 20% of English soil.) Elevations range from 72.5m above mean sea level to 95m AOD in contiguous parts of the town; however, nearest villages range from 85m-90m to the north or from 85m to 115m on a narrow ridge to the south-west at Stone and towards the Chilterns to the south-east (Weston Turville, Stoke Mandeville and North Lee).

The town centre's higher terrain is accurately described by Samuel Lewis in 1848 as a "gentle eminence".

The county's oldest rocks of Jurassic age cover the whole of the northern half of Buckinghamshire, succeeded continuously by younger rocks to the south of the Chilterns.

== Demography ==
In 2021, Aylesbury civil parish had a population of 63,273. The Office for National Statistics also defines an Aylesbury built-up area which includes areas outside of the parish boundary including Aston Reach, Berryfields, Buckingham Park, Fairford Leys, Watermead, and the southern periphery of the town which is in Stoke Mandeville parish; this area had a population of 87,950.

The town's population grew from 28,000 in the 1960s to almost 72,000 in 2011 due in the main to new housing developments, including many London overspill housing estates that were built to ease pressure on the capital. Indeed, Aylesbury, to a greater extent than many English market towns, saw substantial areas of its own heart demolished in the 1950s/1960s as 16th–18th century houses (many in good repair) were demolished to make way for new, particularly retail, development.

Aylesbury's population, in the ten-year period from 2001, grew by 2,000, related primarily to the development of new housing estates. These will eventually cater for 8,000 people on the north side, between the A41 road (Akeman Street) and the A413 and the expansion of Fairford Leys estate.

According to the 2011 census, the religious groupings in Aylesbury were: Christianity (55.7%), no religion (26.9%), Islam (8.3%), Hinduism (1.4%) and other (0.4%); 6.7% of respondents did not state their religion.

Census population of Aylesbury parish
Census	Population	Female	Male	Households	Source
2001	56,457	28,432	28,025	21,971	
2011	58,740	29,442	29,298	23,236	
2021	63,273	31,853	31,420	25,315	

== Governance ==
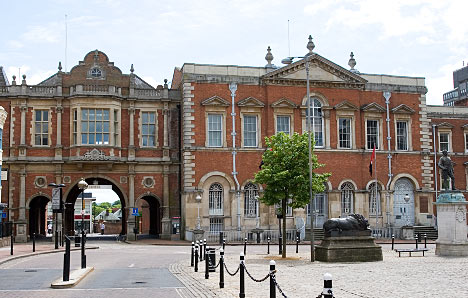
Market Square, Aylesbury. Town Hall Arches (left) and Old County Hall (right)

There are two tiers of local government covering the town, at parish and unitary authority level: Aylesbury Town Council, based at Aylesbury Town Hall at 5 Church Street, and Buckinghamshire Council, which is also based in Aylesbury, having its headquarters at The Gateway on Gatehouse Road.

Aylesbury Town Council is the parish council for the town. As at May 2021, it comprises 25 councillors, 20 of whom are Liberal Democrats and five Conservative. The council represents only the constituents of Aylesbury civil parish. Surrounding villages and some recent developments on the outskirts of Aylesbury, like Fairford Leys and Watermead, have their own parish council. In 2010 the district council decided that the new developments of Berryfields and Weedon Hill, both to the north of Aylesbury, should also join to form a new parish as of May 2011.

The town council also elects the town mayor from the serving town councillors every year. The process culminates in a formal "Mayor Making" ceremony where the new mayor takes over from the preceding mayor. The role of mayor is mainly a ceremonial role representing the town at various events and acting as an ambassador for the town.

Coat of arms of Aylesbury Town Council
Notes Granted to borough council on 5 April 1964. Transferred to successor parish council on 3 April 2002. Crest On a Wreath Argent and Gules issuant from a Wreath of plaited Straw a Mount thereon an Aylesbury Duck all proper. Escutcheon Gyronny of six Gules and Sable a Mute Swan rousant proper on a Chief Or a Saxon Crown Gules. Supporters On the dexter side a Buck proper gorged with a Chain Or pendent therefrom a Hexagon Argent charged with a Garb Gules banded Or and on the sinister side a Stag also proper gorged with a Chain pendent therefrom a like Hexagon charged with a Crescent Sable. Motto Semper Prorsum Badge An Oval gyronny of six Gules and Sable charged with a Saxon Crown Or issuant therefrom a Mount thereon an Aylesbury Duck proper the whole environed by a Garland of Beech Leaves Vert.

=== Administrative history ===
Aylesbury was made a borough by a charter from Mary I in 1554, which gave the town the right to elect two members of parliament and to establish a council to govern itself. The right to establish a council was opposed by the prominent local landowner Thomas Pakington, and it seems likely that this element of the charter was not put into effect at that time. In 1650, following the English Civil War, the town did establish a degree of self-government under the auspices of the 1554 charter. However, in 1664, in the aftermath of the Restoration, the town's short-lived council was abolished and the rights it had held reverted to the Pakington family which had exercised them prior to the civil war. Thereafter the town was governed by its vestry in the same way as most rural areas, although it remained a parliamentary constituency.

In 1849, a local board of health was established to govern the town. This board was replaced by Aylesbury Urban District Council in 1894, which was subsequently given municipal borough status on 1 January 1917, becoming Aylesbury Borough Council. The borough council was awarded a coat of arms in 1964.

In 1974, Aylesbury Borough Council merged with several neighbouring districts to become Aylesbury Vale. No successor parish was initially created for Aylesbury, and it became an unparished area, directly administered by Aylesbury Vale District Council. The civil parish of Aylesbury was re-established in 2001, with its parish council taking the name Aylesbury Town Council. From 2001 to 2020, there were therefore three tiers of local government covering the town, at parish, district and county level.

Aylesbury Vale District Council was abolished in 2020, merging with Buckinghamshire County Council and other district councils, to become a unitary authority called Buckinghamshire Council on 1 April 2020. Since then, it has been responsible for almost all statutory local government functions across the county.

== Education ==
Aylesbury is home to one college of general further education (Aylesbury College on Oxford Road), three grammar schools, two community upper schools, an academy, a university technical college and a host of primary schools.

The secondary schools are:

- Aylesbury Grammar School (boys only)
- Aylesbury High School (girls only)
- Aylesbury Vale Academy
- Buckinghamshire University Technical College
- The Grange School
- Sir Henry Floyd Grammar School
- Mandeville School

There are also three special schools:

- The PACE Centre
- Pebble Brook School
- Stocklake Park Community School, formerly Park School.

The Aylesbury Vale Secondary Support Centre is a Pupil referral unit (PRU), which caters for permanently excluded pupils.

Aylesbury Music Centre is a large educational establishment, which has its own premises adjoining Aylesbury High School and rivals the Royal College of Music, having produced members of national orchestras.

== Health ==
Stoke Mandeville Hospital is a large National Health Service hospital to the south of the town centre. Its National Spinal Injuries Centre is one of the largest specialist spinal units in the world, and the pioneering rehabilitation work carried out there by Sir Ludwig Guttmann led to the development of the Paralympic Games. Stoke Mandeville Stadium was developed alongside the hospital and is the National Centre for Disability Sport in the United Kingdom.

Royal Buckinghamshire Hospital is a private hospital specialising in spinal cord injury.

Aylesbury has provisions for mental health therapy and treatments at the Tindal Centre on Bierton Road. It closed in early 2014; the mental health therapy and treatments, along with adult and older adult mental health teams, moved across the road to the new purpose-built hospital, the Whiteleaf Centre. The former site of the Tindal Centre has been transformed into a new housing development, Bierton Place, which has maintained the architecture of the original building and enhanced its beauty

== Transport ==
=== Railway ===
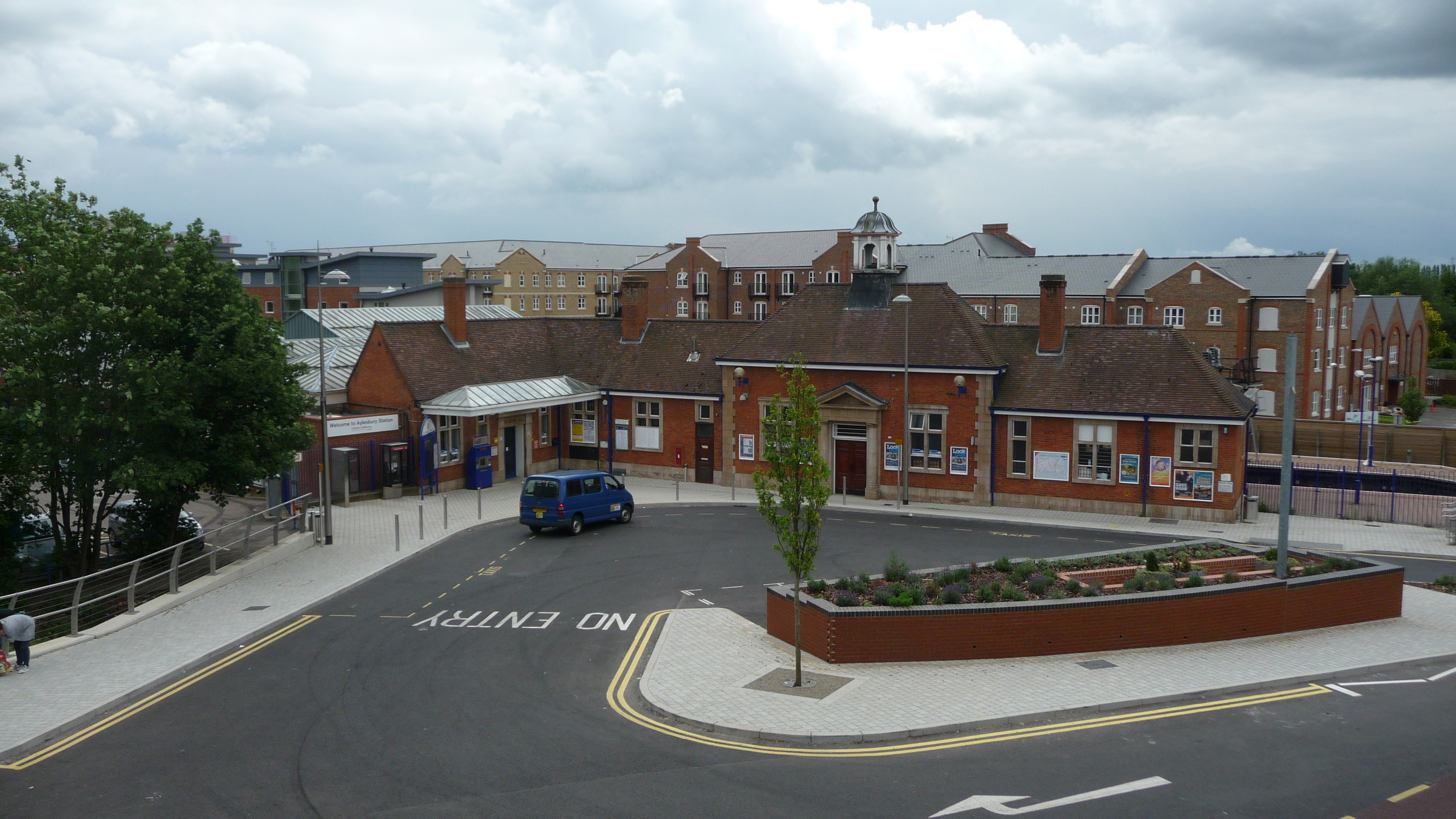
Aylesbury station

The town is served by Aylesbury Vale Parkway, Aylesbury and Stoke Mandeville railway stations; the former is the terminus of services on the London to Aylesbury Line from London Marylebone. There is also a service to Princes Risborough. All services are operated by Chiltern Railways.

East West Rail is being built to connect a new Winslow station to Milton Keynes Central, Bedford and Oxford, via the Claydon LNE Junction; it is due to be opened by 2030. Until then, connections are available to Oxford and Birmingham Moor Street by changing at Princes Risborough.

=== Roads ===
The town is served by the A41 road from London to Birkenhead, which becomes the M40 motorway at Bicester 13 miles (21 km) west (by north) of Aylesbury. The A413 and A418 roads also run through the town. The M40 at junction 9 is 14.7 miles (23.7 km) from the town and the M25 is 21 miles (34 km) away.

=== Buses ===
The town is served by Aylesbury bus station. Routes are operated predominantly by Red Rose Travel, Red Eagle and Arriva Herts & Essex, which connect the town with Buckingham, Chesham, Milton Keynes and Tring.

Buckinghamshire's first "Rainbow Routes" network of bus services are in operation in the town. The colour-coded routes were set up by Buckinghamshire County Council and local operators.

=== Cycling ===
In 2005, the town won £1 million in funding to be one of six cycling demonstration towns in England, which was match-funded by Buckinghamshire County Council. This allowed the council to promote the use of cycling, as well providing facilities for cyclists, such as bike lockers, bike stands, and toucan crossings.

Cycle Aylesbury, the team created to undertake the work, opened the first of their Gemstone Cycleways. This is a network of routes running from town centre to several locations around the town, including Stone, Bierton, Wendover and Watermead.

== Culture ==
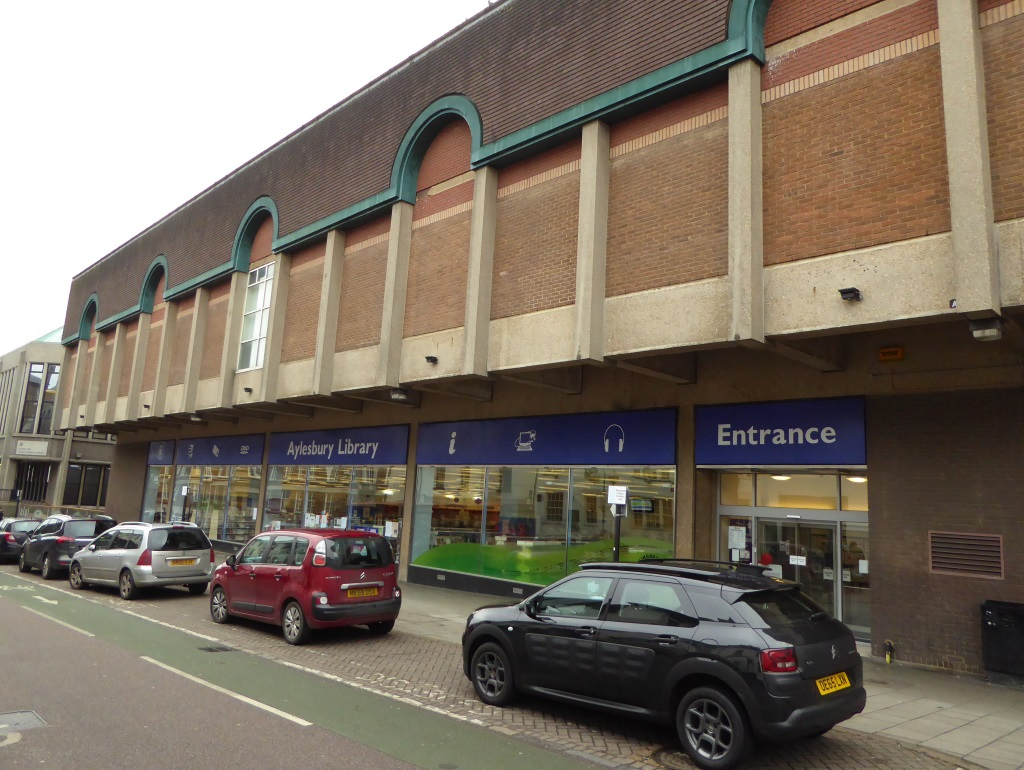
Aylesbury Library

Aylesbury Waterside Theatre, a £42 million theatre, with 1,200-seat auditorium, opened in October 2010. In addition to this, the surrounding area has been redeveloped a £100 million project known as the Waterside Project; there is 260,000 sq ft (24,000 m^{2}) of new retail floor space. A new campus of the [Bucks New University] opened on the Waterside site next to the Waterside Theatre.

The Bourg Walk Bridge (also called the Southcourt Bridge or the Roberts Bridge, after a local councillor) opened in March 2009, connecting Southcourt to Aylesbury town centre. The focus of the footbridge is a central concrete pillar, with four suspension cables supporting the structure. This bridge forms a central part of the Aylesbury Hub project. The bridge was won the Engineering Excellence Award 2009, awarded by the Institution of Civil Engineers' south-east England branch.

The Queens Park Centre, the UK's largest independent arts centre, is also based in the town centre.

== In popular culture ==
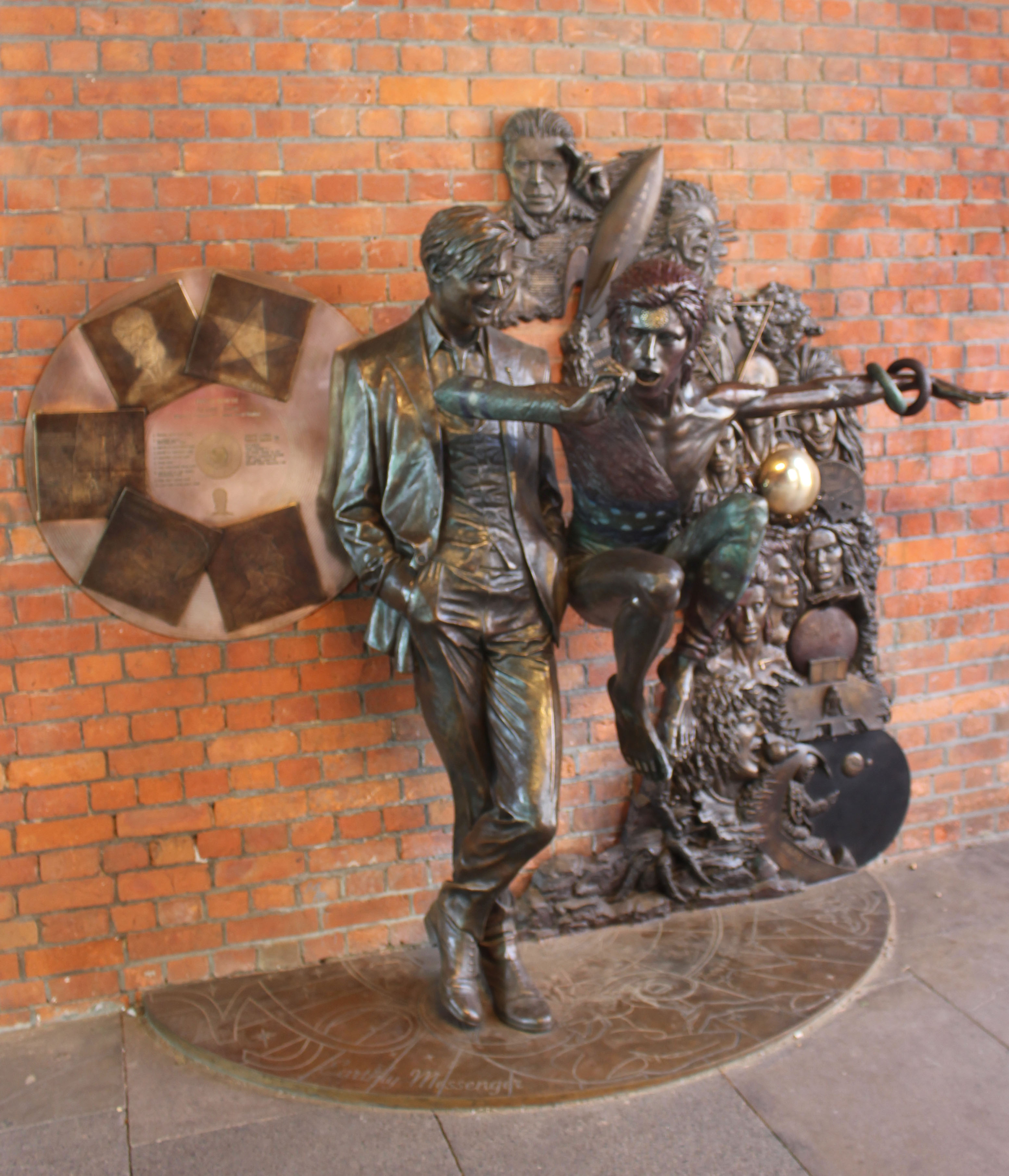
Statue of David Bowie in different guises; he debuted Ziggy Stardust in the town.

A live music nightclub was prominent in the 1960s, 1970s and 1980s; it was renamed the Friars' Club in 1969. The venue hosted many of the top artists of the time, including Jimi Hendrix, the Rolling Stones, Cream, Otis Redding, the Clash, Hawkwind, Queen, Genesis, U2, David Bowie, Talking Heads, Marillion and the Ramones. Friars' Club celebrated its 40th anniversary in 2009 by holding three special concerts that reflected the various phases of the club's musical history. The first concert in June featured the Edgar Broughton Band, the Groundhogs and the Pretty Things.

The rock band Marillion have a close association with Aylesbury. They originally formed there, with the band's first single, "Market Square Heroes" in 1982, taking its title inspiration from Market Square. The band continue to be based in the area, with their Racket Records studio still close to the town. In 2007, the band performed together with their original lead singer, Fish, for the first time in 19 years in the town.

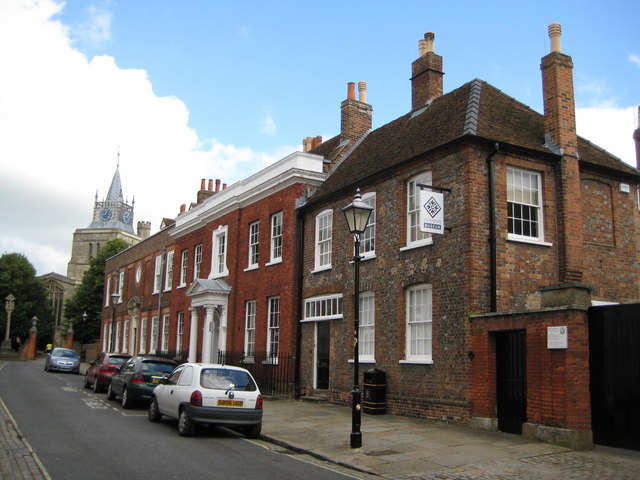
The Buckinghamshire County Museum contains the Roald Dahl Children's Gallery

Aylesbury Methodist Church holds an annual organ recital, which attracts prominent national organists.

The Roald Dahl Children's Gallery, in Church Street, is a children's museum in honour of novelist Roald Dahl that opened on 23 November 1996. Aylesbury hosts the Roald Dahl Festival, a procession of giant puppets based on his characters, on 2 July.

Comedian and actor Ronnie Barker (1929–2005) began his acting career in the town in the late 1940s. In September 2010, almost five years after his death, a bronze statue of him was unveiled by actor David Jason and Barker's one time co-star Ronnie Corbett (the other half of the Two Ronnies) on a new public place in Exchange Street.

=== In productions ===
Scenes from the film A Clockwork Orange were filmed in Friars Square, but did not make it to the final cut. This is the 'librarian scene' where outtakes from the shoot and rehearsal can be seen in Alison Castle's The Stanley Kubrick Archives published by Taschen. The opening scene, in which the droogs beat up an elderly Irishman, is mistakenly cited as being filmed in the underpass linking Friars Square Shopping Centre with the railway station. However, Christiane Kubrick's book Stanley Kubrick – A Life in Pictures states that the underpass in the film has a different shape to the one in Aylesbury and these sequences were actually filmed in Wandsworth.

The county court building and Aylesbury Market Square regularly feature in the BBC television series Judge John Deed.

== Media ==
The local newspaper is the Bucks Herald, which started publishing in January 1832.

BBC Three Counties Radio, the BBC local radio station for the area, broadcasts on 94.7 FM. Mix 96 first broadcast to the town in April 1994 and eventually ceased operations in September 2020; it was replaced by Greatest Hits Radio.

Local news and television programmes are provided by BBC South and ITV Meridian. Television signals are received from the Oxford transmitting station.

== Sport and leisure ==
The town has two semi-professional football teams: Aylesbury Vale Dynamos F.C., which plays at Haywood Way, and Aylesbury United F.C., which currently shares a ground with Chesham United.

There is a cricket club, formed in 1837 with success in the 1950s and 1980s; it is again emerging as one of the stronger clubs in mid- to north-Buckinghamshire.

Since 2013, Aylesbury has been host to a free weekly five km Parkrun every Saturday morning.

The town is represented by Aylesbury Rugby Football Club, situated at Ostler's Field in the nearby village of Weston Turville; "The Ducks" play in the sixth tier of English rugby union.

Aylesbury's recent sporting success comes in gymnastics, with both Jessica and Jennifer Gadirova, of Lynx Gymnastics Aylesbury, winning bronze medals at the Tokyo 2020 Olympic Games for Great Britain.

== Notable people ==
See Category:People from Aylesbury

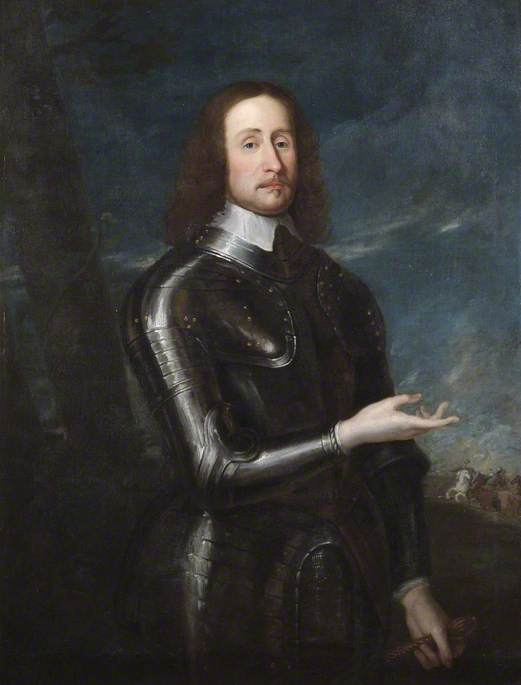
John Hampden MP

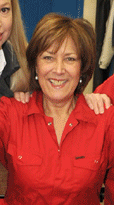
Lynda Bellingham

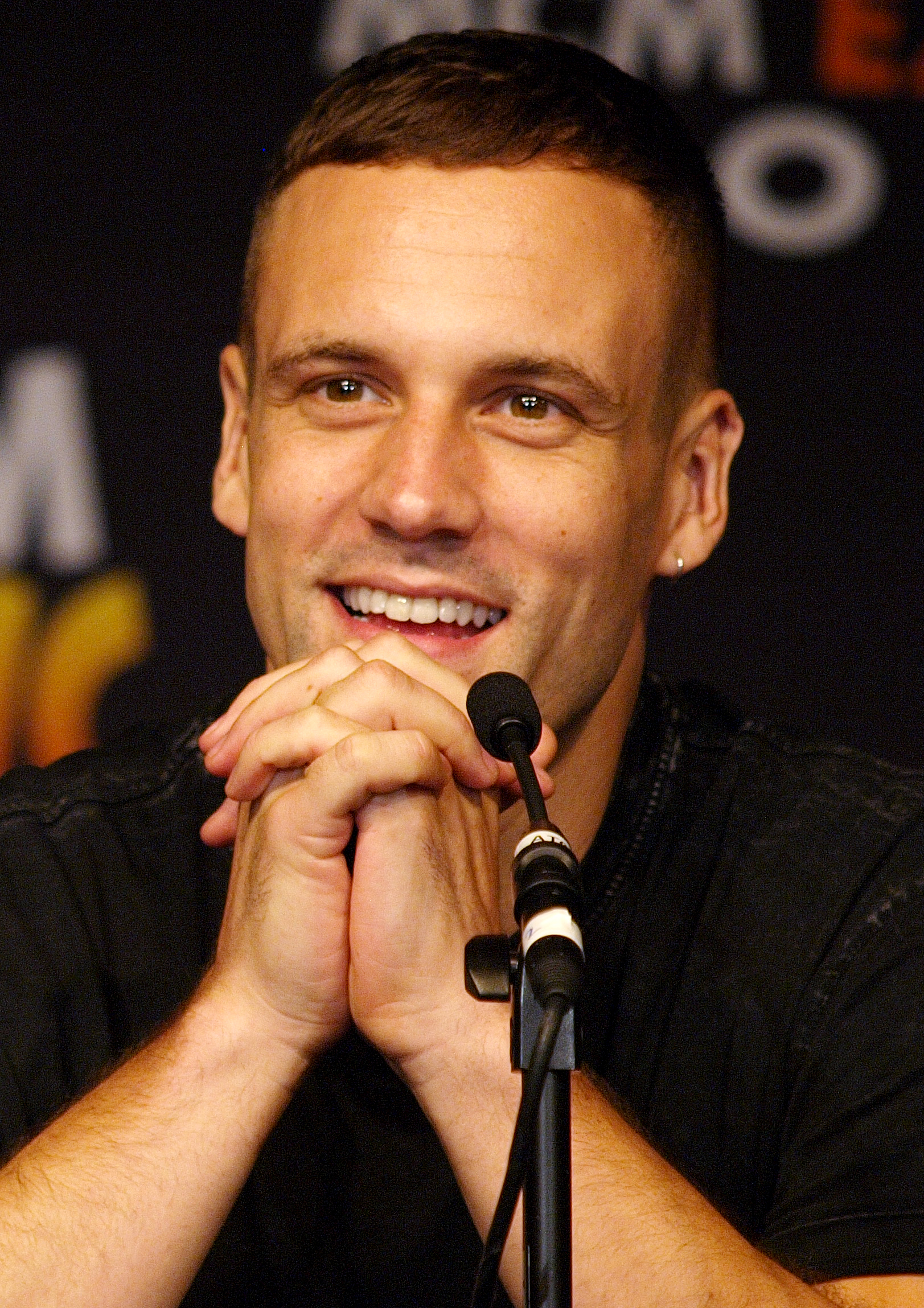
Nick Blood

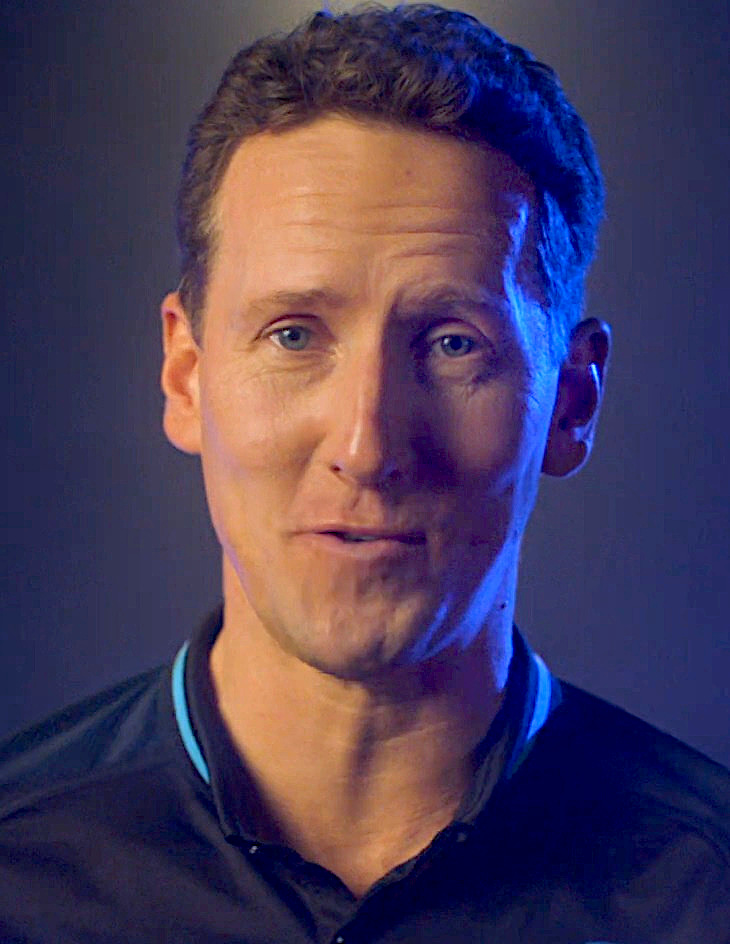
Brendan Cole

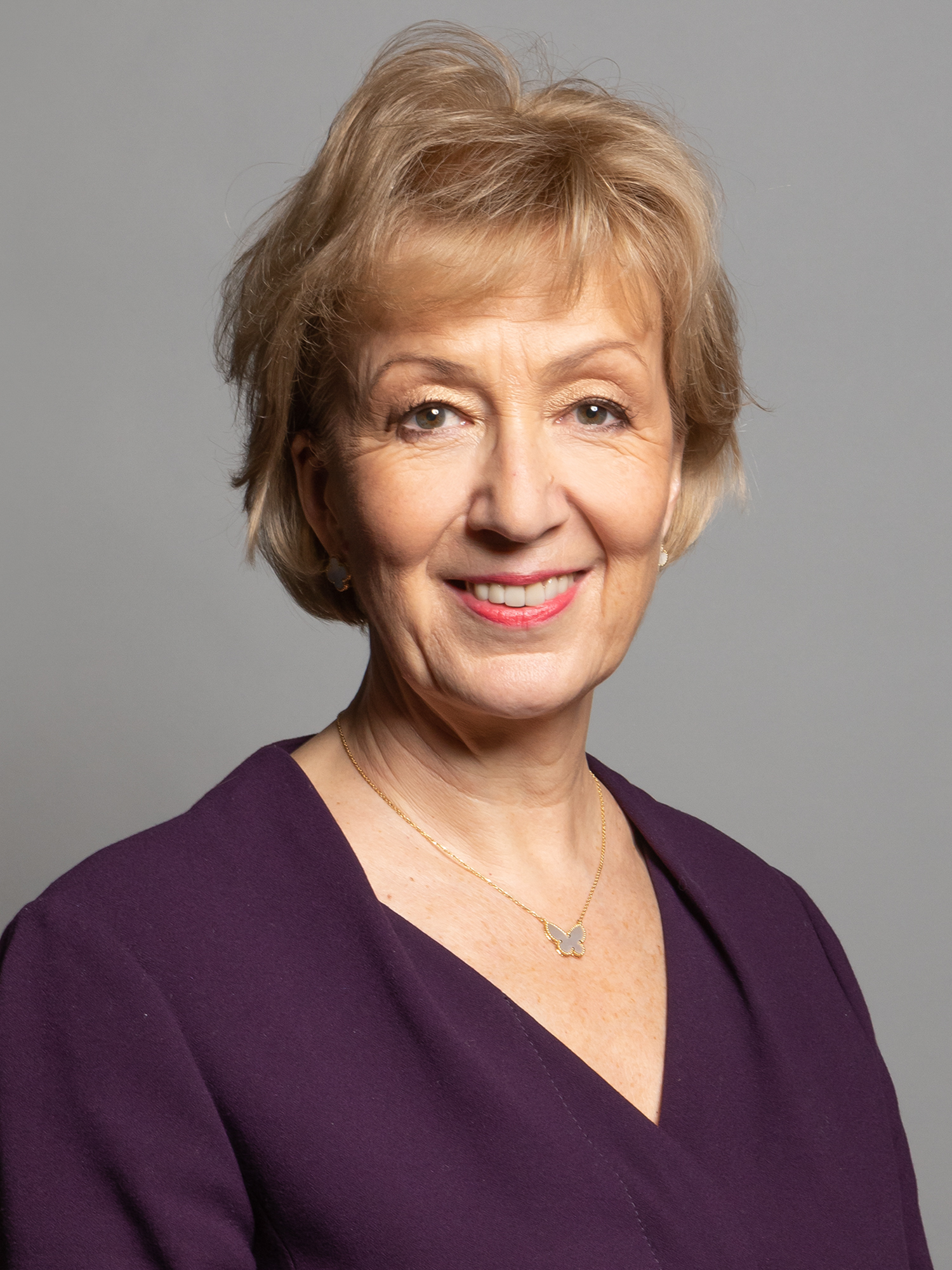
Andrea Leadsom

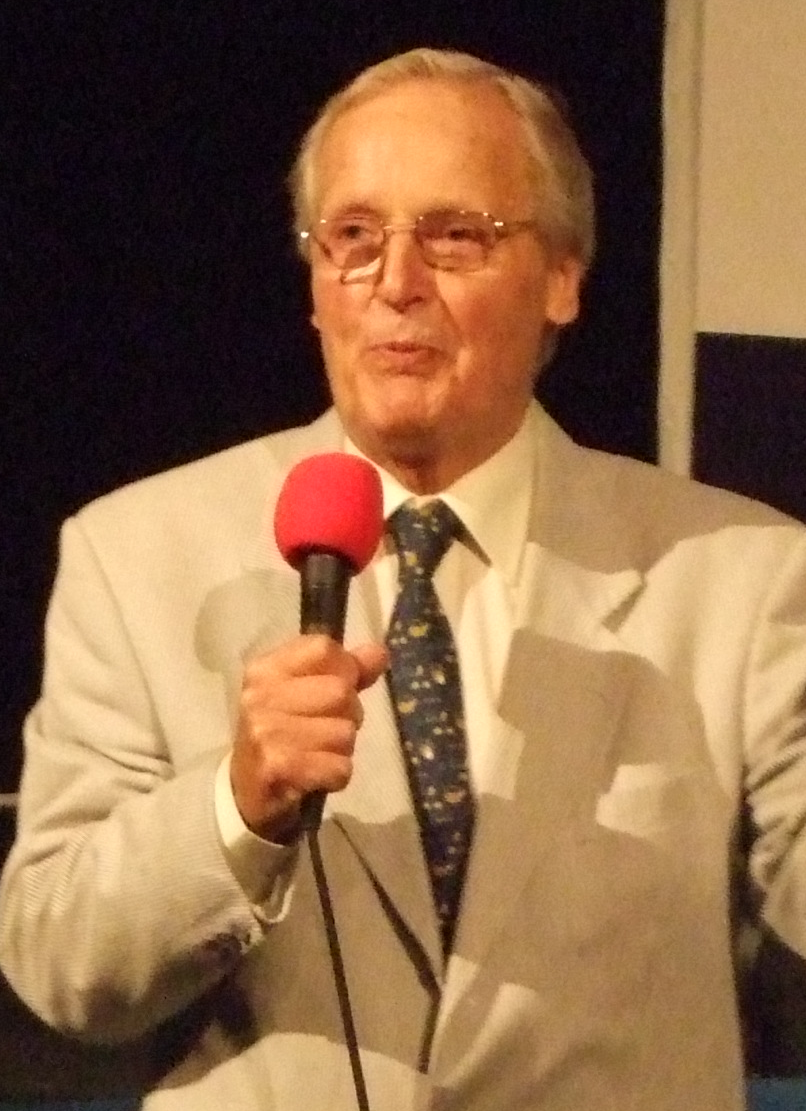
Nicholas Parsons

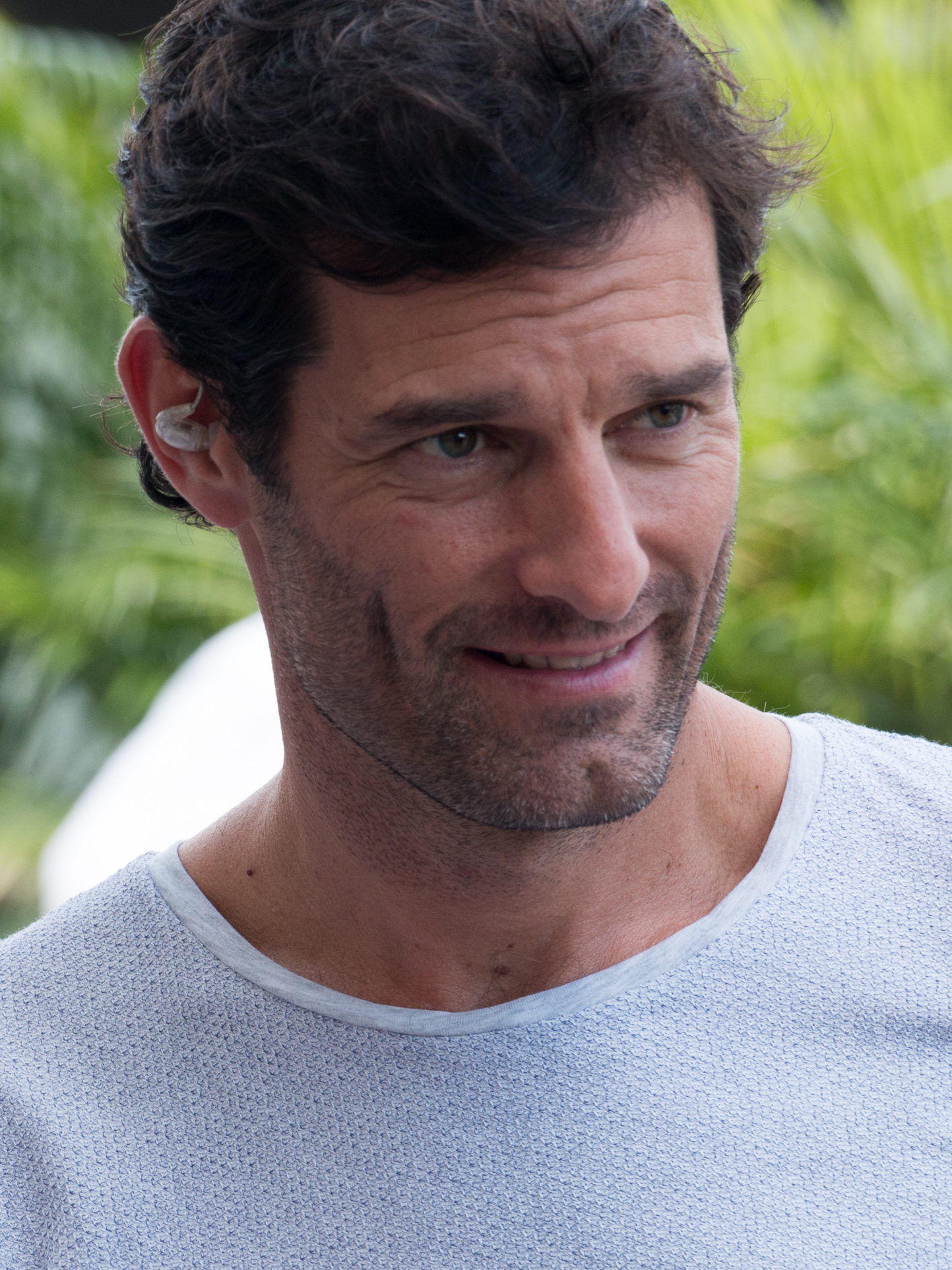
Mark Webber

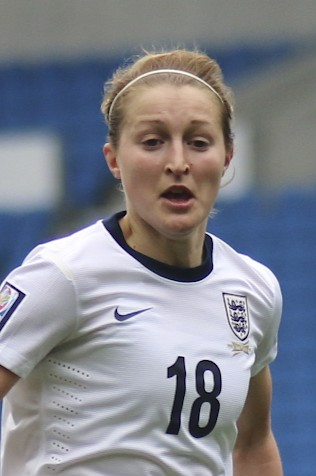
Ellen White

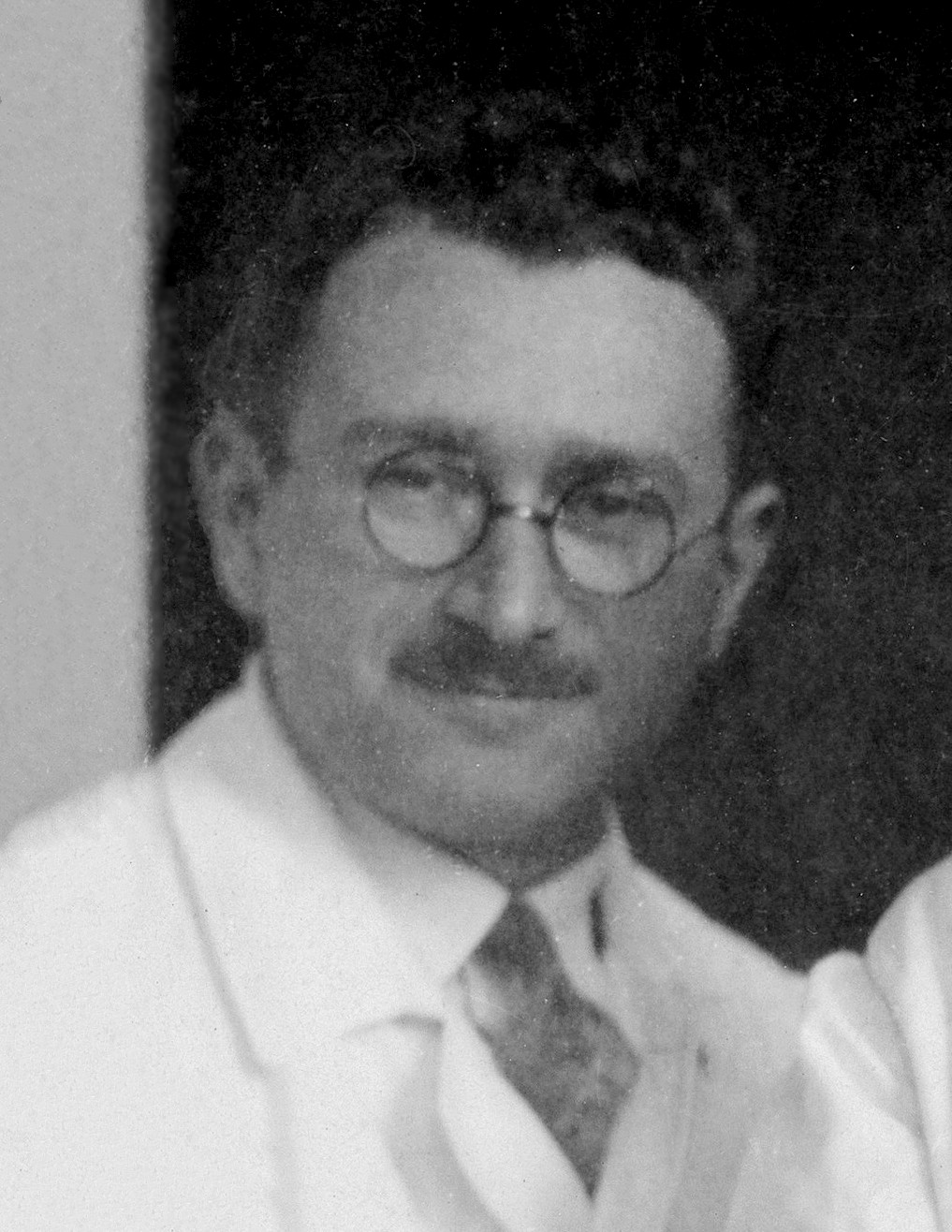
Ludwig Guttmann

In the latter part of the 20th century, the main maternity unit in the district was located in Aylesbury at the Royal Buckinghamshire Hospital; hence a large number of people were born in Aylesbury who may not have had any other association with the town. Those who live, or have lived, in Aylesbury include:

- Bilal Abdullah (born 1980), one of the two terrorists behind the 2007 UK terrorist incidents
- Michael Apted (1941–2021), film director and producer
- Benjamin Bates (1716–1790), physician, art connoisseur and socialite
- Lynda Bellingham (1948–2014), actress, broadcaster and author
- Nick Blood (born 1982), actor, Agents of S.H.I.E.L.D. (2014–2017), The Day of the Jackal (2024)
- Rutland Boughton (1878–1960), English composer and communist, born in the town
- Ernest Bullock (1890–1979), organist, composer and teacher; died in Aylesbury
- Brendan Cole (born 1976), New Zealand-born professional dancer on Strictly Come Dancing from 2004 to 2017
- Mathilde Carré (1908–2007), a French Resistance agent and double agent detainee at Aylesbury Prison
- Barns Courtney (born 1990), singer and songwriter, born in Aylesbury
- Sir Alexander Croke (1758–1842), British judge and colonial administrator in Nova Scotia
- Catherine Anne Davies (born ca.1990), stage name The Anchoress, musician and songwriter
- Greg Day (born 1957), playwright, born in Aylesbury
- Liam Gillick (born 1964), artist, born in Aylesbury
- Martin Grech (born 1982), singer, songwriter and musician
- John Hampden (ca.1595–1643), politician and Parliamentarian during the English Civil War, lived in Hartwell House
- John Junkin (1930–2006), TV performer and scriptwriter, died in Aylesbury
- Andrea Leadsom (born 1963), former Conservative MP for South Northamptonshire; Minister of State for Energy at the Department of Energy and Climate Change; candidate for the leadership of the Conservative Party in 2016
- Samantha Lewthwaite (born 1983), terrorist, grew up in Aylesbury
- Germaine Lindsay (1985–2005), one of the suicide bombers during the 7 July 2005 London bombings
- Constance Markievicz (1868–1927), Irish politician, revolutionary nationalist, suffragette and socialist; inmate at Aylesbury prison in 1916
- John Otway (born 1952), singer and songwriter
- Nicholas Parsons (1923–2020), TV and radio presenter, actor, lived in Aylesbury and died at Stoke Mandeville Hospital
- Charles Pearson (1847–1917), a pioneering Anglican missionary in Uganda
- Sir James Clark Ross (1800–1862), Arctic naval explorer, died in Aylesbury
- Vernon Scannell (1922–2007), a poet and author and former boxer
- William of Sherwood (ca.1200–ca.1272), medieval English scholastic philosopher, logician, teacher and rector of Aylesbury
- Mike Smith (1943–2008), musician, of the Dave Clark Five lived in Aylesbury
- Pete Trewavas (born 1959), musician, member of Marillion
- John Wilkes (1725–1797), a radical journalist and politician; MP for Aylesbury 1757 and 1761, lived at Prebendal House in the town

=== Sport ===
- Emmerson Boyce (born 1979), footballer, born in Aylesbury
- Jennifer and Jessica Gadirova, (twins, born 2004), Team GB gymnasts, won bronze medals at the Tokyo Olympics
- Ludwig Guttmann (1899–1980), neurologist, founded the Stoke Mandeville Games, which became the Paralympic Games
- Matt Phillips (born 1991), footballer, born in Aylesbury
- Mark Webber (born 1976), former Formula 1 driver who raced for Red Bull Racing, Jaguar Racing and Williams F1, with nine career wins; resides in Aston Clinton
- Ellen White (born 1989), England women's national football team, former Chelsea Ladies, Arsenal Ladies, Notts County Ladies, Birmingham City and Manchester City football player from Aylesbury.

== Twin town ==
Aylesbury is twinned with the French town of Bourg-en-Bresse, 267 mi (430 km) east of Paris.

== Gallery ==
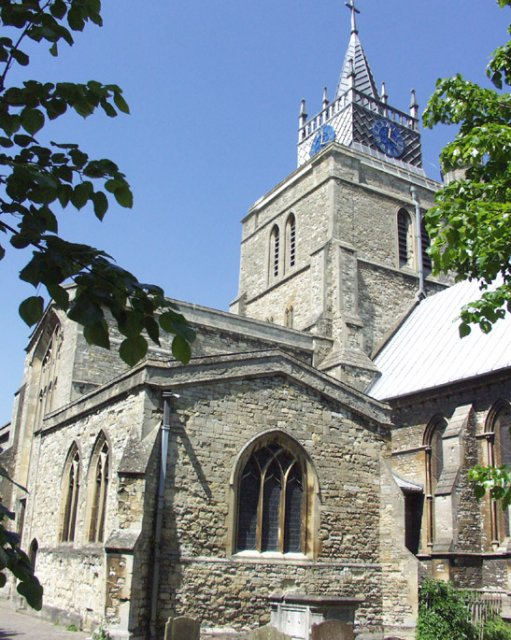
Church of St Mary, Aylesbury – Grade I listed church

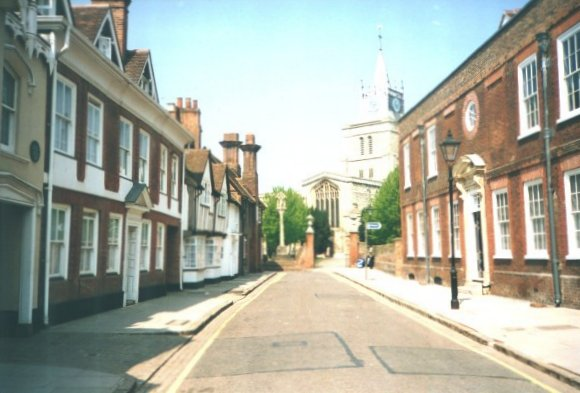
The Old Grammar School, now museum and other buildings, Church Street, Aylesbury

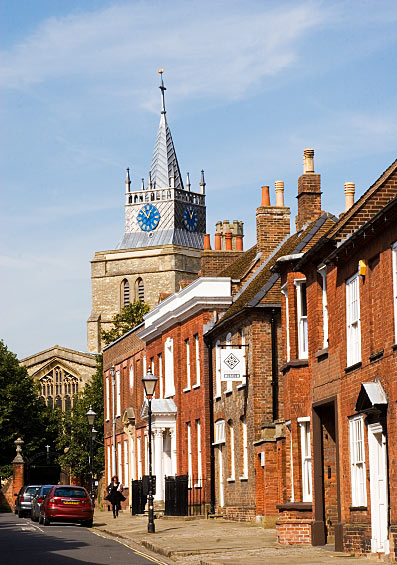
Church Street – detail

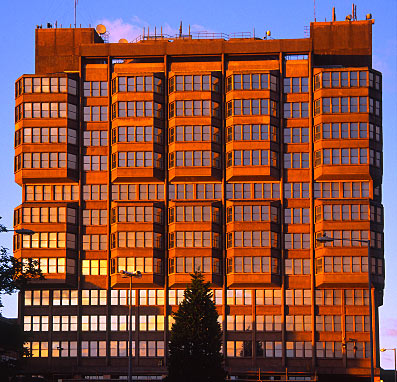
Bucks 'New' County offices

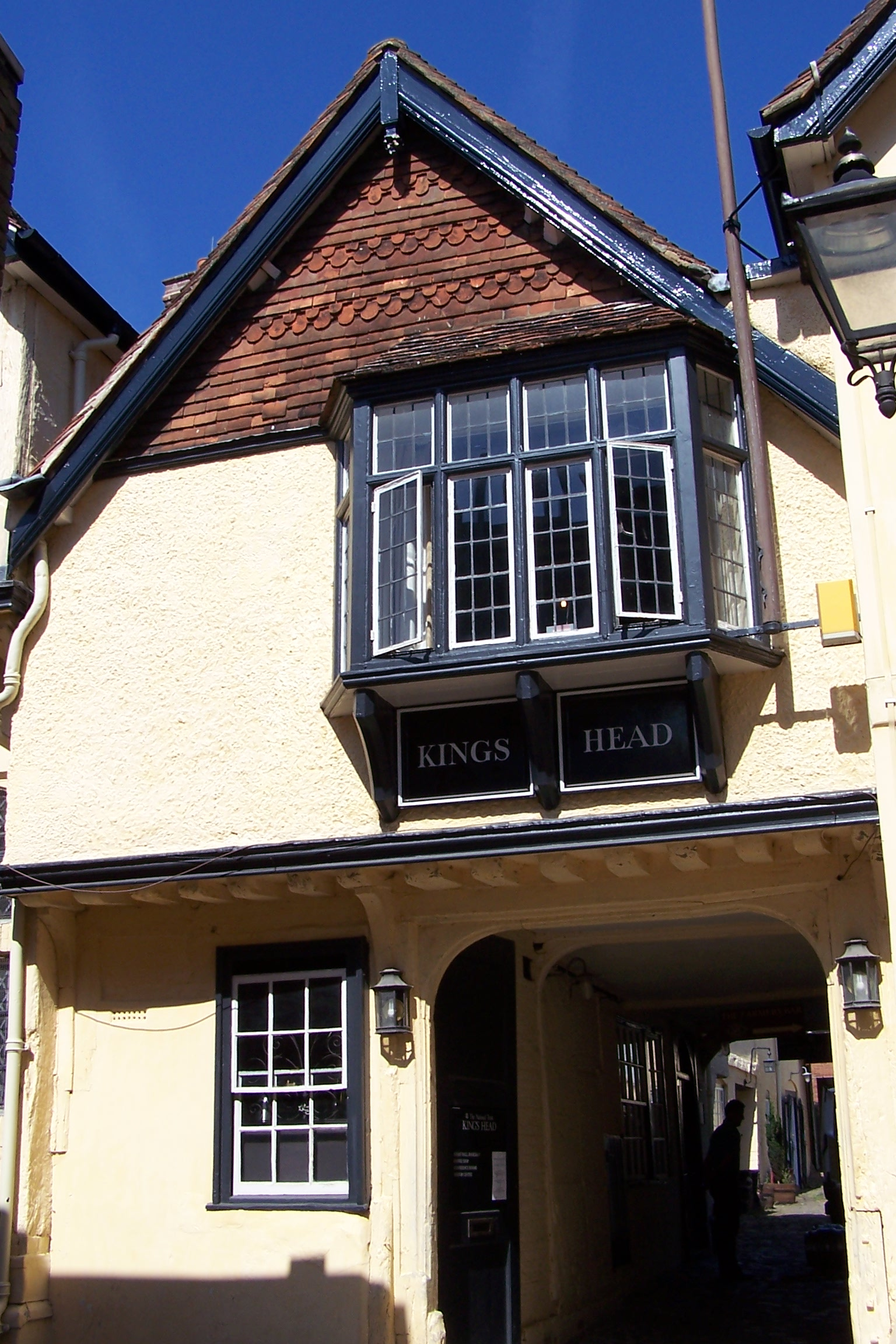
15th century King's Head Inn

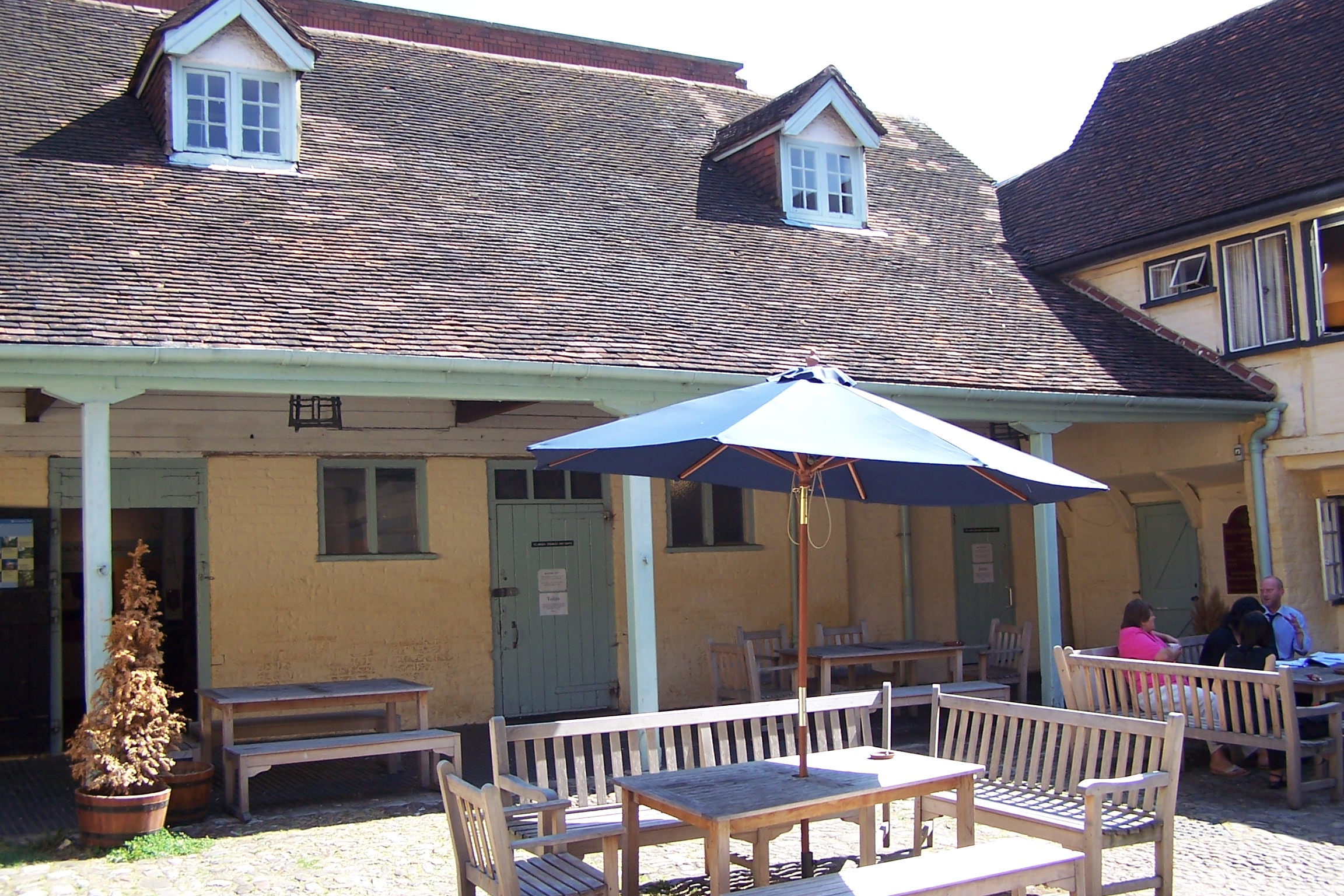
Beer garden of King's Head Inn

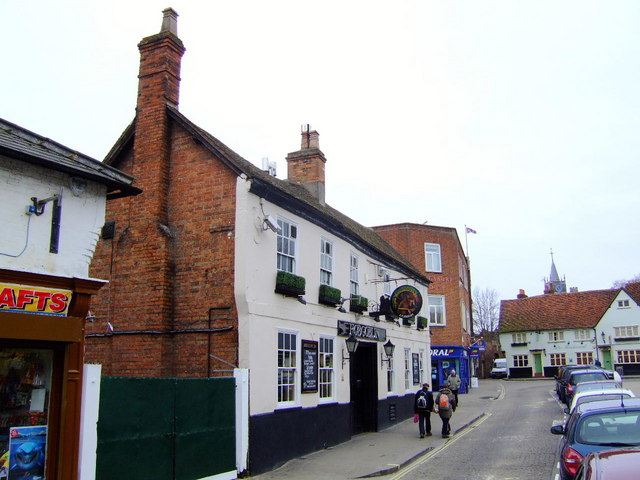
Hobgoblin Inn

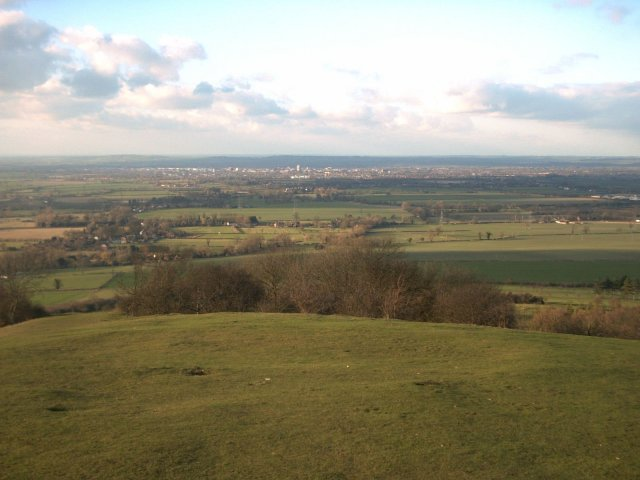
Part of Aylesbury Vale taken from the top of Coombe Hill, looking towards Aylesbury – the town's shape is visible.

== Freedom of the Town ==
The following people have received the Freedom of the Town of Aylesbury:

- Freda Roberts: 25 April 2016.
- Ellen White: 25 April 2016.

== See also ==
- Architecture of Aylesbury
