= Mandeville School, Aylesbury =

Mandeville School

Location
- Ellen Road; Aylesbury, Buckinghamshire, HP21 8ES; England
- Coordinates: 51°47′57″N 0°48′51″W

Information
- Type: Academy
- Motto: Believe, Achieve, Succeed
- Local authority: Buckinghamshire
- Trust: Insignis Academy Trust
- Department for Education URN: 148851 Tables
- Ofsted: Reports
- Head of School: Sara Durose
- Gender: Coeducational
- Age: 11 to 18
- Enrolment: 1,002 (as of 2024)
- Houses: Hartwell, Windsor, Rothschild, Verney, Chequers
- Colours: Maroon, Silver and Dark Teal
- Website: http://www.mandeville.bucks.sch.uk/

The Mandeville School is a coeducational secondary school located in Aylesbury, Buckinghamshire, England.

Built in the 1960s, there are approximately 1050 students currently attending Mandeville, aged between 11 and 18 years.

== History ==
During the 1970s, England Rugby Prop Forward, Gary Pearce attended the school and played several games against Aylesbury Grammar School. In July 2004 the school was awarded specialist school status as a Sports College, an accolade reserved for the more successful schools in England.

Previously a community school administered by Buckinghamshire Council, in January 2022 The Mandeville School converted to academy status. It is now sponsored by the Insignis Academy Trust.

== Notable alumni ==
Gary Pearce (rugby union)

== Mobile phone masts ==
Mandeville School is one of several Buckinghamshire schools which host mobile phone masts. Contracts between Buckinghamshire Council and various mobile phone operators generate an income of £145,000 per annum, of which about £59,000 comes from contracts for masts that are installed in schools.
