= Stocklake Park Community School =

Location
- Aylesbury, Buckinghamshire; England
- Coordinates: 51°49′11″N 0°48′14″W

Information
- Type: Community special School
- Local authority: Buckinghamshire
- Department for Education URN: 110581 Tables
- Ofsted: Reports
- Headteacher: Christine Stephenson
- Gender: Mixed
- Age: 11 to 19
- Enrolment: 65
- Website: http://www.park.bucks.sch.uk/

Stocklake Park Community School, (formerly known as Park School), is a co-educational special school in Aylesbury, Buckinghamshire. It is a community school, which takes children from the age of 11 through to the age of 19. The school has approximately 65 pupils.

The school caters for children with severe and multiple learning difficulties. Prior to 2007 the school also catered for children of primary school age.

== Charitable Connection ==
Park School is notable in that in 1983 it received a donation of a minibus, raised from funds from a golf match. The organisers of this golf match were English rugby supporters who had watched England win the Wooden Spoon in the 1983 Five Nations Championship. They went on to found the Wooden Spoon Society which in 2007 is now a major charity in the UK and Ireland, raising funds for disadvantaged children and young people.
