= Sir Henry Floyd Grammar School =

Location
- Oxford Road; Aylesbury, Buckinghamshire, HP21 8PE; England; 51.8132°N 0.8236°W

Information
- Other name: SHFGS
- Type: Academy
- Motto: Working Together to Inspire, Challenge and Achieve
- Established: 1947
- Local authority: Buckinghamshire County Council
- Trust: Insignis Academy Trust
- Department for Education URN: 136845 Tables
- Ofsted: Reports
- Head teacher: Sam Holdsworth (Acting as of 9 January 2023)
- Gender: Mixed
- Age range: 11–18
- Enrolment: 1,230 (2019)
- Capacity: 1,305
- Houses: Ascott; Claydon; Hartwell; Mentmore; Stowe; Waddesdon
- Colours: Maroon and black
- Alumni: Old Floydians
- Website: www.sirhenryfloyd.co.uk

Sir Henry Floyd Grammar School (SHFGS) is an 11–18 mixed, grammar school and sixth form with academy status in Aylesbury, Buckinghamshire, England. It is named after Sir Henry Floyd, a former Lord Lieutenant of Buckinghamshire. As a selective school, its entry requirements are governed by the exam taken by students entering Year 7.

== History ==
The school was founded as the Aylesbury Technical College in 1948. The original school was built in Walton Road Aylesbury and remained there until the early 1960s. The School had been a 'selective' school for many years requiring a 'pass' in the Eleven Plus examination to attain entry. When it moved to its current site on Oxford Road in 1963, the name was changed to Aylesbury Technical High School. In 1965, the school was renamed as The Sir Henry Floyd Grammar School, after Sir Henry Floyd, the Lord Lieutenant of Buckinghamshire at the time.

== Houses ==
The school has a house system of six houses, which are named after estates in the local area and represented by a colour. Students are allocated to a house. The houses are:

- Ascott – Yellow
- Claydon – Purple
- Hartwell – Red
- Mentmore – Green
- Stowe – Light blue
- Waddesdon – Blue

== Facilities ==
The school has a performing arts building, complete with theatre, music practice rooms and a recording studio. It also has a library, computer rooms, two of which are specialised for technology and performing arts departments, laptops for departmental use, and two further suites of computers specifically for sixth form students. It also houses multiple science labs. The whole school site has WiFi access.

In addition, it has a large sports field which is used for football, rugby, cricket and athletics plus five tennis courts which are also used for netball and tennis. A new sports hall was given planning permission in 2006 which was completed in 2014.

== Performing arts ==
The school has a performing arts program which was awarded a "performing arts specialism" in 2007. The school performed a production of Kiss/Marry/Push Off Cliff by Josh Azouz at National Theatre Connections in 2024.

== Notable alumni ==
- The Japanese House - indie pop band
- Dylan Bachelet - Great British Bake Off finalist
- Edward Morello MP for West Dorset (UK Parliament constituency)
- Jof Owen of the band The Boy Least Likely
