= Queens Park Centre =

Arts centre and theatre in Buckinghamshire, England

Queens Park Arts Centre is an independent arts centre and theatre in Aylesbury, Buckinghamshire, England.

== Programme ==
Queens Park Arts Centre offers more than 100 workshops on a weekly basis, covering artistic disciplines such as pottery, painting & drawing, drama, dance, music, woodwork, textiles and jewellery making. Additional classes run during the school holidays, whilst other one-off workshops explore more specialised subjects such as blacksmithing.

Queens Park is also the home of the Limelight Theatre, a 120-seater venue which offers live music, theatre and comedy on Friday and Saturday nights. Acts who have performed at the theatre include Eddie Izzard, Jo Brand, John Otway, Wild Willy Barrett and Chris Ramsey.

Additional facilities at the Centre include multiple exhibition spaces, a Coffee Shop, licensed bar, and a shop selling art supplies and resources.

The Centre regularly holds events for the local community, including Art & Craft Fairs and Maker's Fairs.

Successful projects at the Centre included the WanderHouse Outreach Project - which has enabled artistic collaborations with thousands of children in schools across Buckinghamshire and Hertfordshire, and still ongoing, Unbound - the centre's resident theatre company which stages multiple productions each year, including a pantomime.

Sarah Lewis is the Chief Executive at the centre. The centre's Theatre Director is Dario Knight. Abby Colwell is currently the Arts Centre Co-ordinator.

== History ==
Queens Park Arts Centre is based in a former Edwardian primary school, which was built between 1906 and 1907. The school was utilised as a military hospital during the First World War, with the last patient being discharged in August 1919. The school reopened the following month and closed in 1976.

The venue receives no funding from local government. It is the largest independent arts centre in the United Kingdom. It was established in 1980 and was first directed by Malcolm Thackwray through funding by Buckinghamshire County Council. In 1998, the Centre became an independent company when its government funding was withdrawn. £325,000 was raised to purchase the freehold to the site, which was secured in 2009. Since then in excess of £200,000 has been raised to refurbish and restore the building.
