= Traffic park =

Playground for training road safety

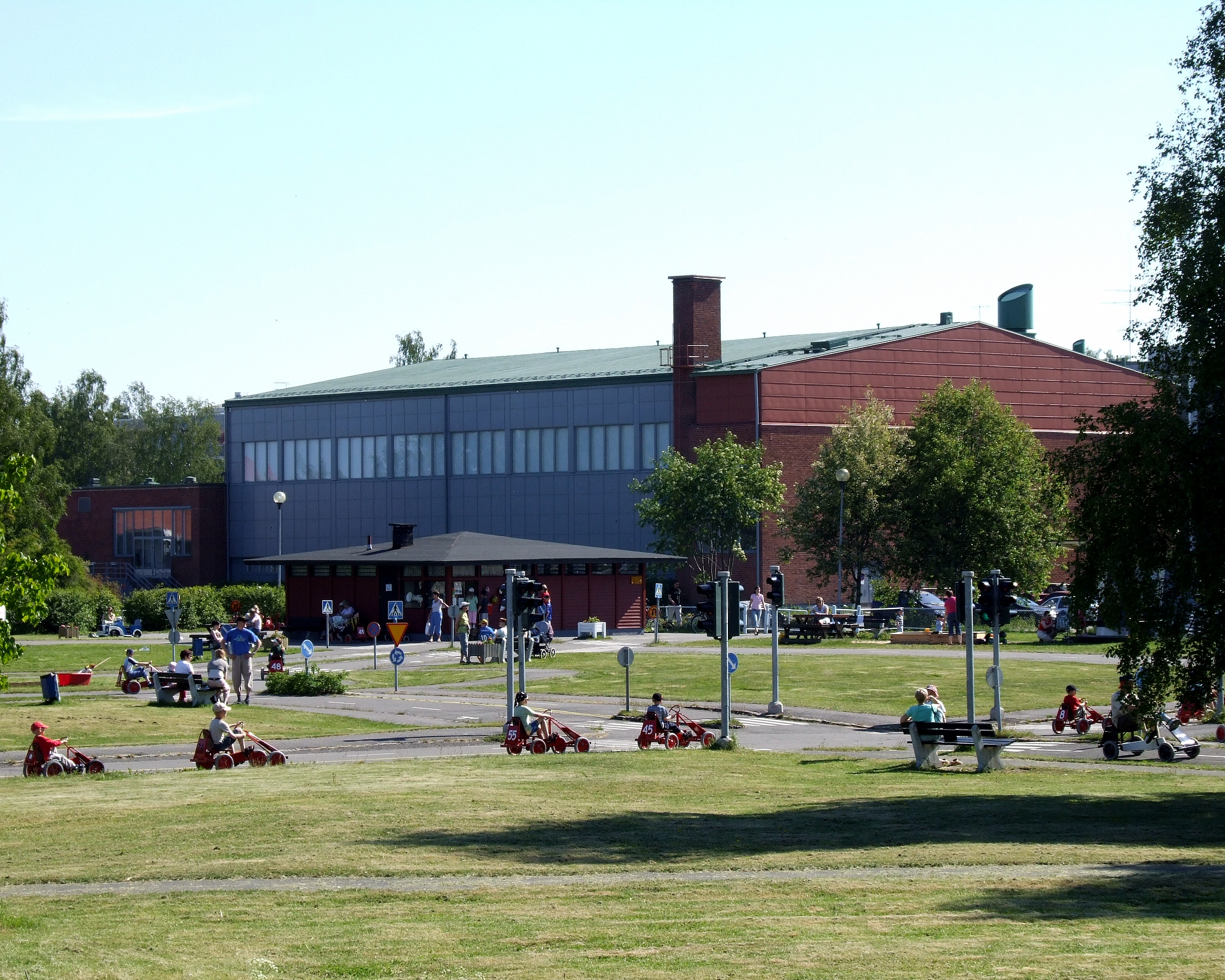
A children's traffic park in Hollihaka, Oulu, Finland

A traffic park or children's traffic park is a park in which children can learn the rules of the road. A traffic park may also be called a traffic garden, transportation park, safety village, learn-to-ride area or Safety Town depending on locale.

Traffic parks are frequently created as an attraction within a larger park. In other cases, they are single-use parks and often small in scale. They can be found in urban areas as well as rural areas.

Children are allowed to use bicycles or pedal-powered cars to navigate the streets and operate according to traffic laws. Sometimes they share a buggy with their parent, who can provide guidance as they circle the park. Typically, traffic parks are scaled-down versions of real street networks, with the lane and street-width proportional to the smaller vehicles. Often they include operating traffic signals and during busy times are even staffed with traffic police.

One of the intentions of the traffic park is to improve awareness of traffic safety among school-aged children. Many traffic parks enable children to gain hands-on experience crossing streets and with bicycle or other pedestrian safety challenges in a highly controlled environment devoid of actual motor vehicles.

Traffic parks exist throughout Asia, Europe, and North America. Traffic parks in Asia and Europe are focused on traffic safety through pedal-powered vehicles. In the United States and Canada they use bicycles as well as electric, motorized vehicles. These North American parks are called safety villages, because of broader emphasis on safety for fire, electrical, food and other educational purposes.

As well as traffic parks, the United Kingdom also has permanent road safety facilities often known as lifeskills centres or safety centres. These differ from traffic parks in that they are typically fully indoors, not open to the public, and feature several separate life-sized sets.

== Parks ==
=== Australia ===
- Apex Merriwa Traffic School, Wangaratta, Victoria.
- Buzy Kidz Traffic School, Mill Park, Victoria.
- Camelot Traffic School, Moorabbin, Victoria.
- Casey Safety Village, Cranbourne, Victoria.
- Constable Care Safety School, Maylands, Western Australia.
- Essendon Traffic School, Essendon, Victoria.
- GDF Suez Traffic School, Morwell, Victoria.
- Kew Traffic School, Kew, Victoria.
- SAPOL Road Safety Centre, Thebarton Police Barracks, Adelaide, South Australia. Prior to this, it was located down the road, but was closed to make way for the new Royal Adelaide Hospital

=== Belgium ===
- Mechelen

=== Canada ===
- Chilliwack, British Columbia.
- Victoria, British Columbia. Vancouver Island Tom Thumb mobile safety village.
- Belleville, Ontario
- Chatham, Ontario
- Durham, Ontario
- Lambton, Ontario
- London, Ontario
- Niagara, Ontario
- Ottawa, Ontario (Opened in 1972, flooded in 2006, closed in 2007 and demolished in 2010. Rebuilding efforts are currently underway)
- Peel, Ontario
- Waterloo, Ontario
- Windsor, Ontario
- York, Ontario

=== Czech Republic ===
In the Czech Republic, there is over 150 traffic parks, that are permanently situated in nearly every town or city of population over 20 000. There is also the concept of "moving" parks that are transported from place to place.

- Prosek, Prague
- Olomouc
- Velké Meziříčí

=== Finland ===
- Lasten liikennekaupunki in Helsinki, Finland. It opened on 20 May 1958, near the Olympic Stadium. It received an upgrade in the 1960s, adding small traffic lights.
- Kupittaanpuisto park in Turku, Finland.
- Rahtarit-liikennepuisto in Kangasala, Finland.
- Hollihaan liikennepuisto in Oulu, Finland.
- Lasten liikennekaupunki in Lappeenranta, Finland.

=== France ===
- Marseille

=== Germany ===
- In Germany traffic parks for bicycles are widespread and a part of school education. The road maps are often found painted on the ground of schoolyards of primary schools and equipped with temporary traffic signs during lessons. In cities, there are often dedicated traffic parks with permanent signs and small traffic lights.

=== Hong Kong ===
- Hong Kong Road Safety Town, Sau Mau Ping, Kowloon
- Sha Tin, New Territories
- North Point, Hong Kong Island

=== Indonesia ===
- Bandung

=== Japan ===
- Fuchu, Tokyo
- Koganei, Tokyo
- Mitaka, Tokyo
- Suginami, Tokyo
- Tama, Tokyo

=== Russia ===
- Автоград, St. Petersburg

=== Netherlands ===
- Utrecht

=== North Korea ===
- Pyongyang, the largest children's traffic park in the country.
- Kanggye
- Tanchon
- Nampo

=== Turkey ===
- Serdivan Belediyesi Trafik Park. Biggest children traffic park in Asia. Built by Serdivan Municipality. This traffic park is a non-profit organization. There are 20 electric cars, 30 bicycle helmets, 10 bicycles, a classroom for theorical traffic education, a mini-hospital for first-aid education in the park.

=== United Kingdom ===
==== Safety Centres ====
- Hazard Alley Safety Centre, Milton Keynes
- Safety Central, Lymm
- Warning Zone, Leicester
- DangerPoint, Talacre
- Lifeskills, Bristol
- SkillZONE, Gloucester
- Bury Safety Centre, Greater Manchester
- SafetyWorks, Newcastle
- SafeSide Centre, Birmingham

==== Traffic Parks ====
- Coney Hall Recreation Ground, Bromley
- Cyclopark, Gravesend
- Watford Cycle Hub, Watford
- Hillsborough Park, Sheffield
- Lordship Recreation Ground, Tottenham
- Wythenshawe Park, Manchester
- Seashell Trust Campus, Stockport
- Witton Country Park, Blackburn
- Everton Park Mini Roads, Liverpool
- Bellamy Road estate, Mansfield
- Rectory Park, Sunderland
- Temple Newsam, Leeds
- Recreation Ground, Stratford-upon-Avon
- Tower Gardens, Chelmsford
- Alice Park, Bath, Somerset

=== United States ===
- Ashville, Chautauqua County, New York, funded by corporate advertising on vehicles, helmets, and buildings
- Baton Rouge, Louisiana
- Boston, Massachusetts - Moakley Park, South Boston
- Cobb County, Georgia
- Elmhurst, Illinois
- Elyria, Ohio
- Escondido, California
- Frisco, Texas
- Huntington, West Virginia
- Mansfield, Ohio Mansfield is the location of the first Safety Town.
- Pasco County, Florida
- Portsmouth, Virginia
- Newport, Rhode Island
- Strongsville, Ohio
- Temecula, California
- Washington County, Maryland
