= Buckinghamshire =

County of England

- Ceremonial county
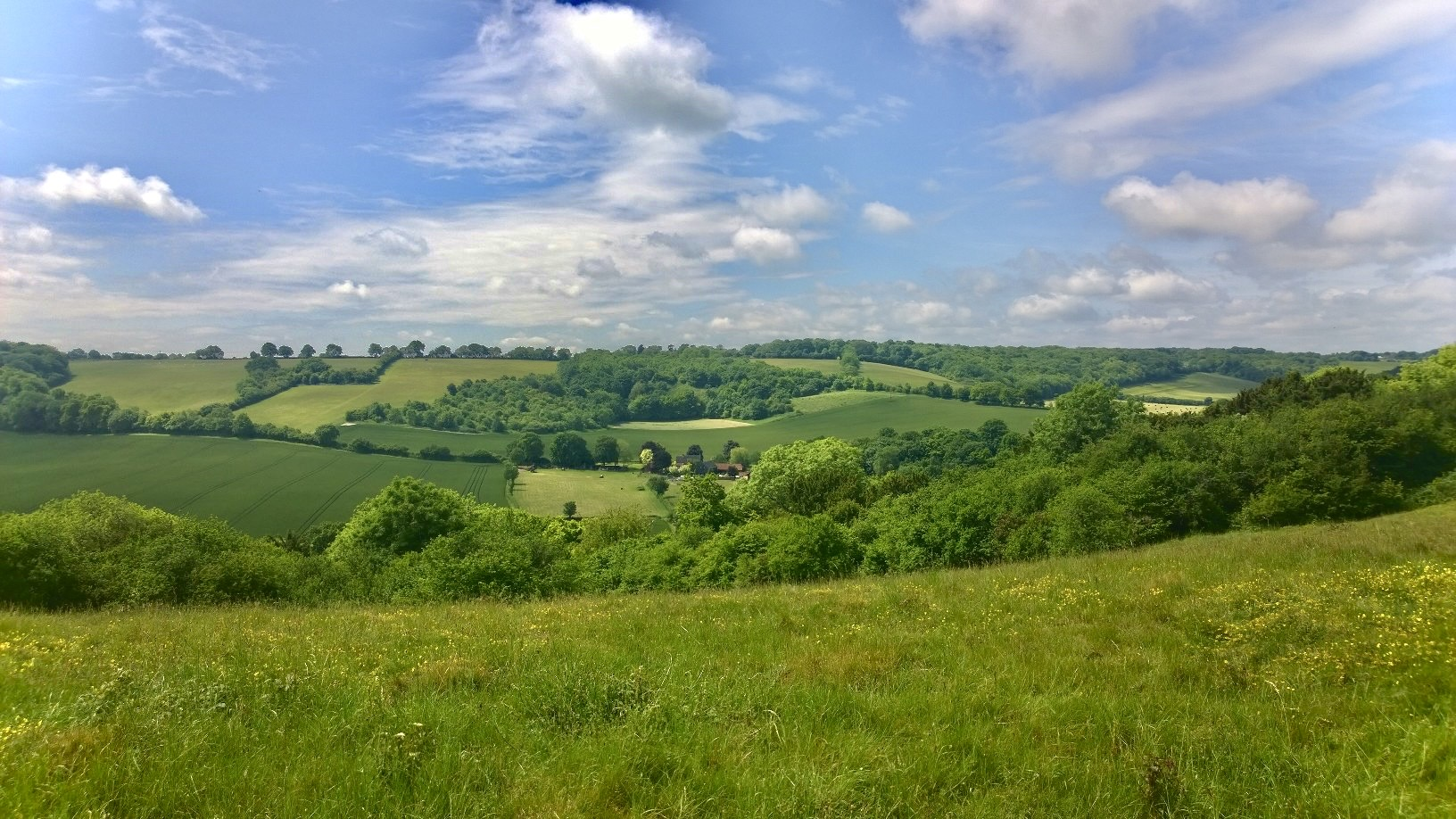
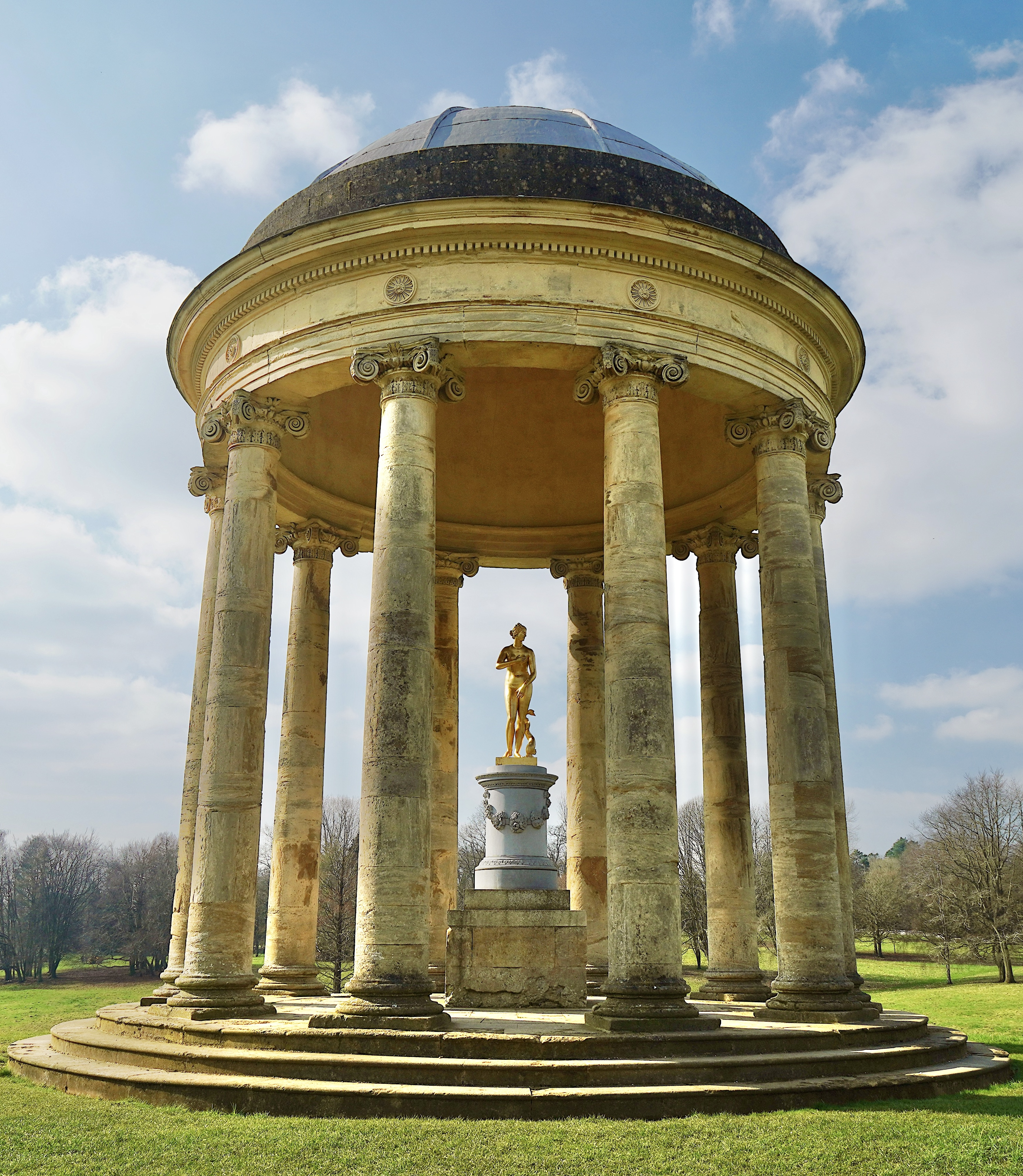
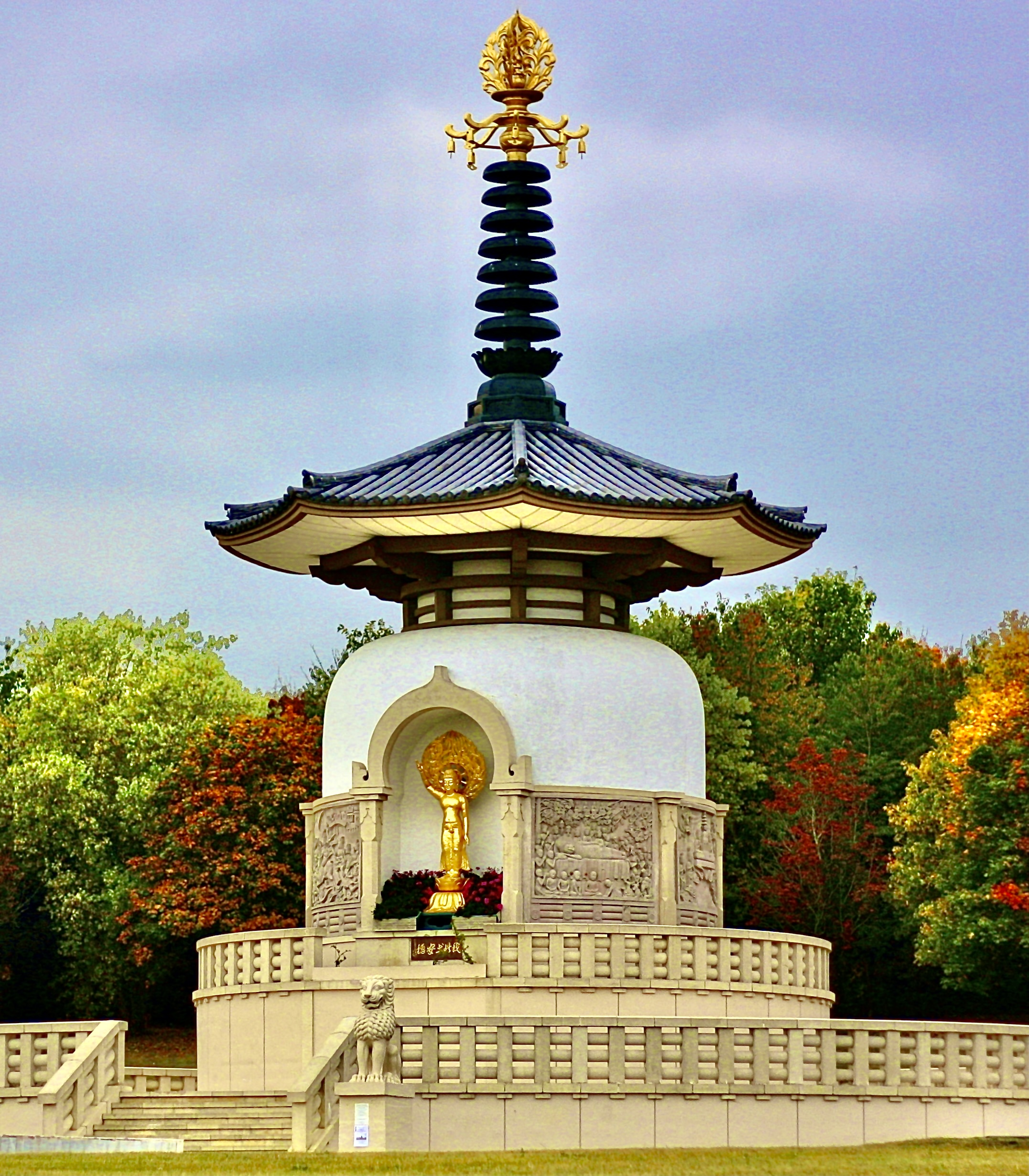
- The Chiltern Hills, the Rotunda in Stowe Gardens (bottom left), and the Peace Pagoda in Milton Keynes (bottom right)

- Buckinghamshire shown within England
- Coordinates: 51°50′N 0°50′W
- Sovereign state: United Kingdom
- Constituent country: England
- Region: South East
- Established: Ancient
- Time zone: UTC+0 (GMT)
  - Summer (DST): UTC+1 (BST)
- UK Parliament: 8 MPs
- Police: Thames Valley Police
- Largest city: Milton Keynes
- Ceremonial county
- Lord Lieutenant: Elizabeth Curzon, Countess Howe
- High Sheriff: Pippa Kirkbridge (2025–26)
- Area: 1,874 km^{2} (724 sq mi)
  - Rank: 32nd of 48
- Population (2024): 884,656
  - Rank: 29th of 48
  - Density: 472/km^{2} (1,220/sq mi)
- Unitary authorities
- Councils: Buckinghamshire Council; Milton Keynes City Council
- Districts
- Districts of Buckinghamshire; Unitary
- Districts: 1. Buckinghamshire; 2. Milton Keynes

Buckinghamshire (/ˈbʌkɪŋəmʃər, -ʃɪər/, abbreviated Bucks) is a ceremonial county in South East England. It is bordered by Northamptonshire to the north, Bedfordshire to the north-east, Hertfordshire to the east, Greater London to the south-east, Berkshire to the south, and Oxfordshire to the west. The largest settlement is the city of Milton Keynes.

The county has an area of 1,874 km^{2} (724 sq mi) and had an estimated population of 884,656 in 2024. Besides Milton Keynes, which is in the north-east, the largest settlements are in the centre and south of the county and include Aylesbury, High Wycombe, and Chesham. For local government purposes the county comprises two unitary authority areas, Buckinghamshire and Milton Keynes. The county historically had slightly different borders, and included the towns of Slough and Eton. It is one of the home counties.

The Chiltern Hills, an Area of Outstanding Natural Beauty, occupy the south of the county and contain its highest point, Haddington Hill (267 m (876 ft)). The Chilterns are the source of the River Ouzel, which flows across the lowland Vale of Aylesbury in the north of the county and through Milton Keynes before meeting the River Great Ouse at Newport Pagnell. The Thames forms part of the county's southern boundary.

Notable amenities in the county include Pinewood Film Studios, Dorney rowing lake and part of Silverstone race track on the Northamptonshire border. Many national companies have headquarters or major centres in Milton Keynes. Heavy industry and quarrying is limited, with agriculture predominating after service industries.

== History ==
Map of Bucks (1904)

The name Buckinghamshire is Anglo-Saxon in origin and means The district (scire) of Bucca's home. Bucca's home refers to Buckingham in the north of the county, and is named after the Anglo-Saxon landowner, Bucca. The county has been so named since about the 12th century; however, the county has existed since it was a subdivision of the kingdom of Mercia (585–919).

The history of the area predates the Anglo-Saxon period and the county has a rich history starting from the Brittonic and Roman periods, though the Anglo-Saxons perhaps had the greatest impact on Buckinghamshire: the geography of the rural county is largely as it was in the Anglo-Saxon period. Later, Buckinghamshire became an important political arena, with King Henry VIII intervening in local politics in the 16th century, and just a century later the English Civil War was reputedly started by John Hampden in mid-Bucks.

Historically, the biggest change to the county came in the 19th century, when a combination of cholera and famine hit the rural county, forcing many to migrate to larger towns to find work. Not only did this alter the local economic situation, but it meant land was selling cheaply at a time when the rich were more mobile. Buckinghamshire became a popular home for London commuters.

The expansion of London and establishment of the railways promoted the growth of towns in the south of the county such as Aylesbury, Amersham and High Wycombe, leaving Buckingham itself to the north as a relative backwater. As a result, most county institutions are now based in the south of the county or in Milton Keynes, rather than in Buckingham.

== Geography ==
The county can be split into two sections geographically. The south leads from the River Thames up the gentle slopes of the Chiltern Hills to the more abrupt slopes on the northern side leading to the Vale of Aylesbury and the City of Milton Keynes UA, a large and relatively level expanse of land that is the southern catchment of the River Great Ouse.

=== Waterways ===
==== Rivers ====
The county includes parts of two of the four longest rivers in England. The Thames forms the southern boundary with Berkshire, which has crept over the border at Eton and Slough so that the river is no longer the sole boundary between the two counties. The Great Ouse rises just outside the county in Northamptonshire and flows east through Buckingham, Milton Keynes and Olney.

==== Canals ====
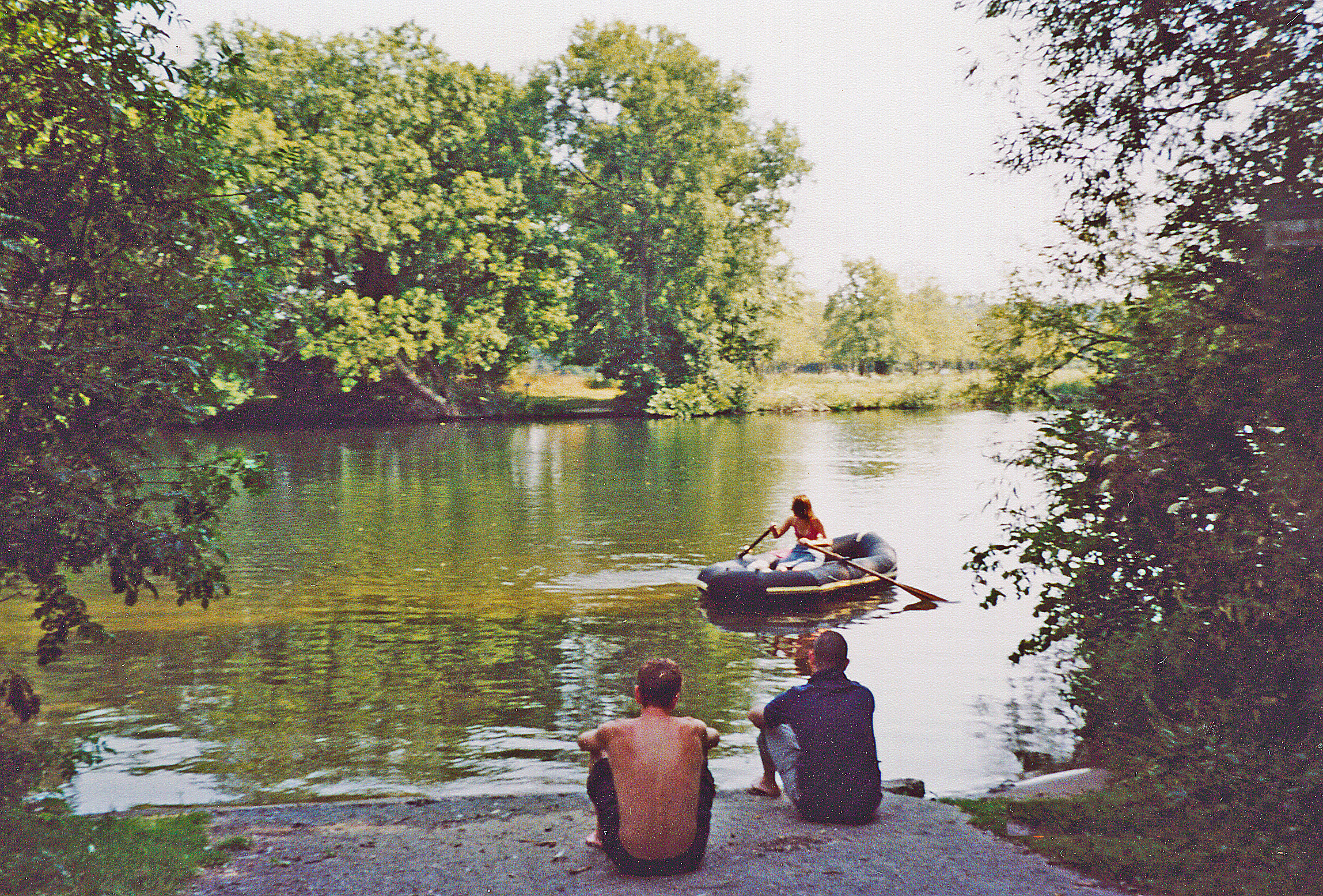
The River Thames at Medmenham

The main branch of the Grand Union Canal passes through the county as do its arms to Slough and Aylesbury, as well as the disused arms to Wendover and Buckingham. The canal has been incorporated into the landscaping of Milton Keynes.

=== Landscape ===
The southern part of the county is dominated by the Chiltern Hills. The two highest points in Buckinghamshire are Haddington Hill in Wendover Woods (a stone marks its summit) at 267 m (876 ft) above sea level and Coombe Hill near Wendover at 260 m (850 ft).

==== Mineral extraction ====
In the past, the region was a hub of quarrying for chalk and clay for brickmaking. Flint, also extracted from quarries, was used to build older local buildings. Several former quarries, now flooded, have become nature reserves.

== Demography ==
Buckinghamshire unitary authorities
Authority	Main towns	Population (2011)	Area (km^{2})	Population density (2011)	Projected population (2026)
Buckinghamshire Council	Aylesbury, Buckingham, High Wycombe, Marlow, Amersham, Chesham, Beaconsfield, Burnham	505,283	1564.95	323/km^{2}	530,800
Milton Keynes City Council	Milton Keynes urban area (includes towns of Bletchley, Central Milton Keynes, Fenny Stratford, Newport Pagnell, Stony Stratford, Woburn Sands and Wolverton), Olney	248,821	308.63	806/km^{2}	323,146
Total for ceremonial county		754,104	1873.58	402/km^{2}	853,946

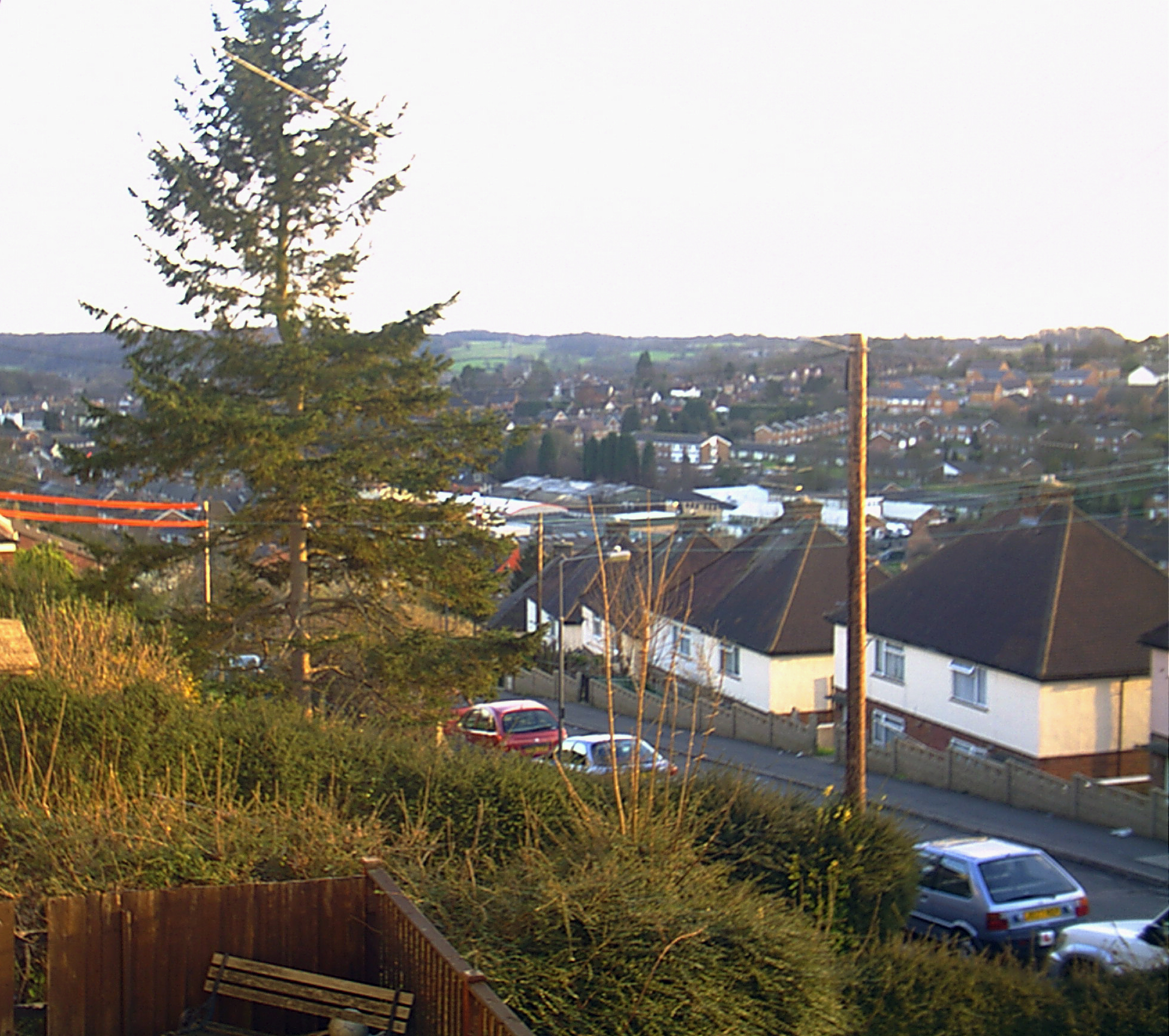
Suburban housing, Chesham

The administration of Buckinghamshire is further sub-divided into civil parishes.

Today Buckinghamshire is ethnically diverse, particularly in the larger towns. At the end of the 19th century some Welsh drover families settled in north Bucks and, in the last quarter of the 20th century, a large number of Londoners in Milton Keynes. Between 6 and 7% of the population of Aylesbury are of Asian or Asian British origin. Likewise Chesham has a similar-sized Asian community, and High Wycombe is the most ethnically diverse town in the county, with large Asian and Afro-Caribbean populations. During the Second World War there were many Polish settlements in Bucks, Czechs in Aston Abbotts and Wingrave, and Albanians in Frieth. Remnants of these communities remain in the county.

== Politics ==
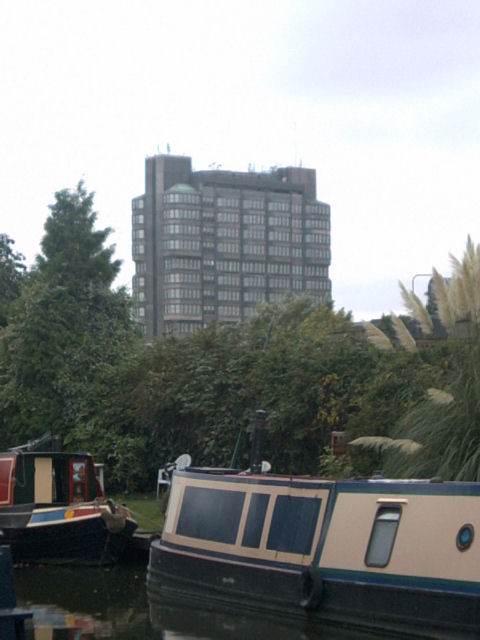
Bucks County Council's County Hall

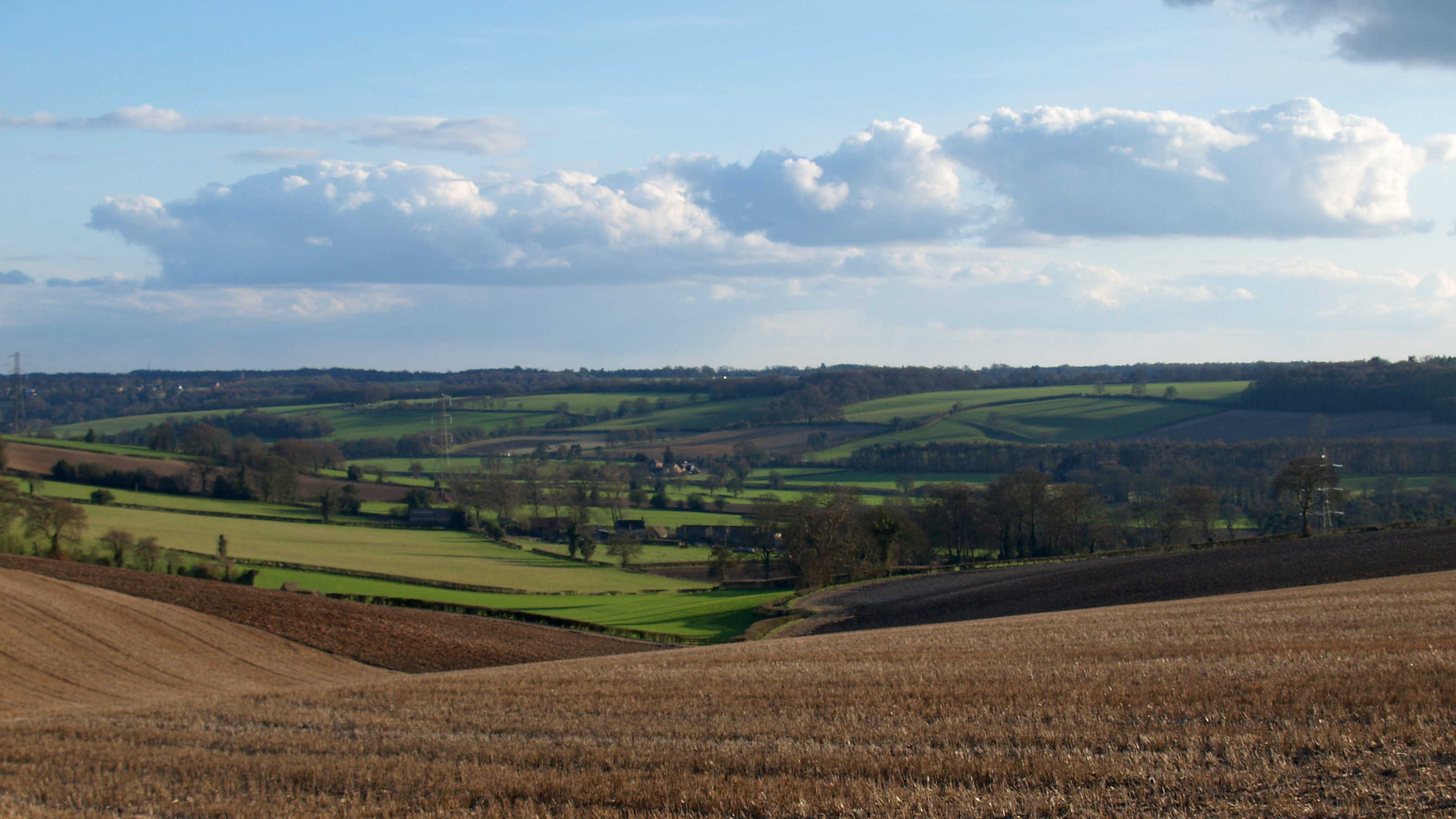
Wendover Dean

=== Ceremonial ===
The ceremonial county of Buckinghamshire consists of both unitary authority areas combined. The ceremonial county has a Lord Lieutenant and a High Sheriff. Since November 2020, the Lord Lieutenant of Buckinghamshire is The Countess Howe and the High Sheriff of Buckinghamshire is Dame Ann Geraldine Limb, DBE of Stony Stratford The office of Custos rotulorum has been combined with that of Lord Lieutenant since 1702.

The ceremonial county has two top-level administrations – both are unitary authorities – Buckinghamshire Council, which administers about four-fifths of the county and two-thirds of its population, and Milton Keynes City Council, which administers the remainder.

=== Buckinghamshire County Council (1889–1997) ===
Buckinghamshire County Council was founded in 1889 with its base in new municipal buildings in Walton Street, Aylesbury (which are still there).

In 1966, the council moved into new premises: a 15-storey tower block in the centre of Aylesbury (pictured) designed by county architect Fred Pooley. It is now a Grade II listed building.

From 1974 (following the Local Government Act 1972) local administration was run on a two-tier system where public services were split between the county council and five district councils (Aylesbury Vale, Chiltern, Milton Keynes, South Bucks and Wycombe).

=== Buckinghamshire County Council (1997–2020) ===
In 1997, the northernmost part of Buckinghamshire, until then Milton Keynes District, was separated to form a unitary authority, the Borough of Milton Keynes; for ceremonial purposes Milton Keynes remains part of Buckinghamshire. The administration of the remainder of the county continued to be called Buckinghamshire County Council.

Buckinghamshire County Council was a large employer in the county and provided a variety of services, including education (schools, adult education and youth services), social services, highways, libraries, County Archives and Record Office, the County Museum and the Roald Dahl Children's Gallery in Aylesbury, consumer services and some aspects of waste disposal and planning.

=== Buckinghamshire Council (2020 onwards) ===
Buckinghamshire Council is a unitary authority covering most of the ceremonial county of Buckinghamshire. It was created in April 2020 from the areas that were previously administered by Buckinghamshire County Council and the district councils of South Bucks, Chiltern, Wycombe, and Aylesbury Vale.

=== Milton Keynes City Council ===
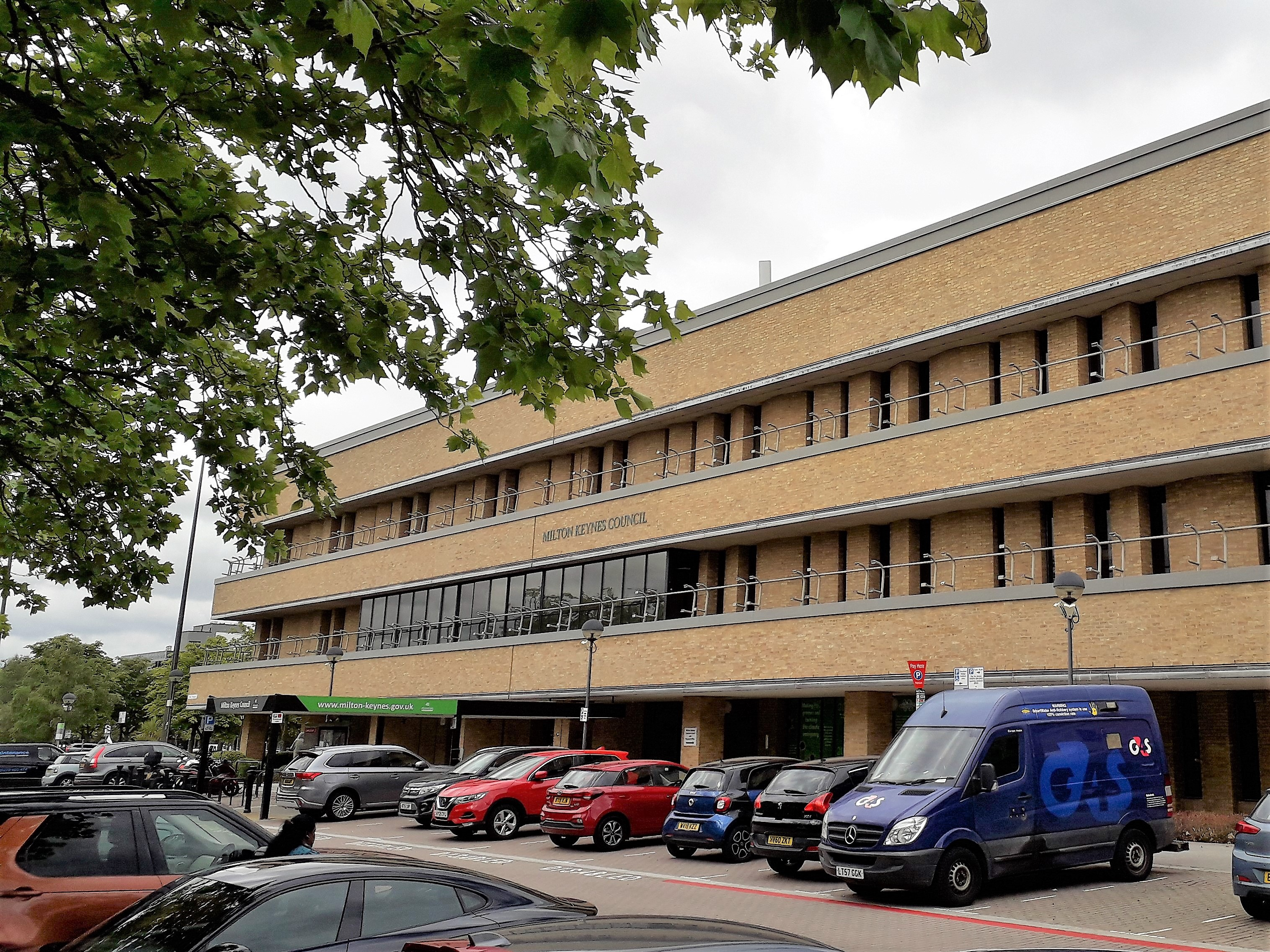
City Council building in Central Milton Keynes

A local authority for North Buckinghamshire was formed by the Local Government Act 1972, styled as the "Milton Keynes District Council" and subordinate to Buckinghamshire County Council. Its (district) council was first elected in 1973, a year before formally coming into its powers and prior to the creation of the District of Milton Keynes on 1 April 1974. The council was granted borough status on its foundation, entitling it to be known as "Milton Keynes Borough Council" and to annually appoint a (ceremonial) Mayor of Milton Keynes. On 1 April 1997, the Borough became a self-governing unitary authority, independent of the County Council. Following award of Letters Patent in 2022, the Borough became the City of Milton Keynes, and its council became Milton Keynes City Council. The remit of the City Council extends beyond the Milton Keynes urban area, encompassing a significant rural area with villages, hamlets, and the market town of Olney.

=== Flag ===
The flag of the historic county of Buckinghamshire

The traditional flag of Buckinghamshire comprises a chained swan on a bicolour of red and black. The flag was registered with the Flag Institute on 20 May 2011.

=== Coat of arms ===
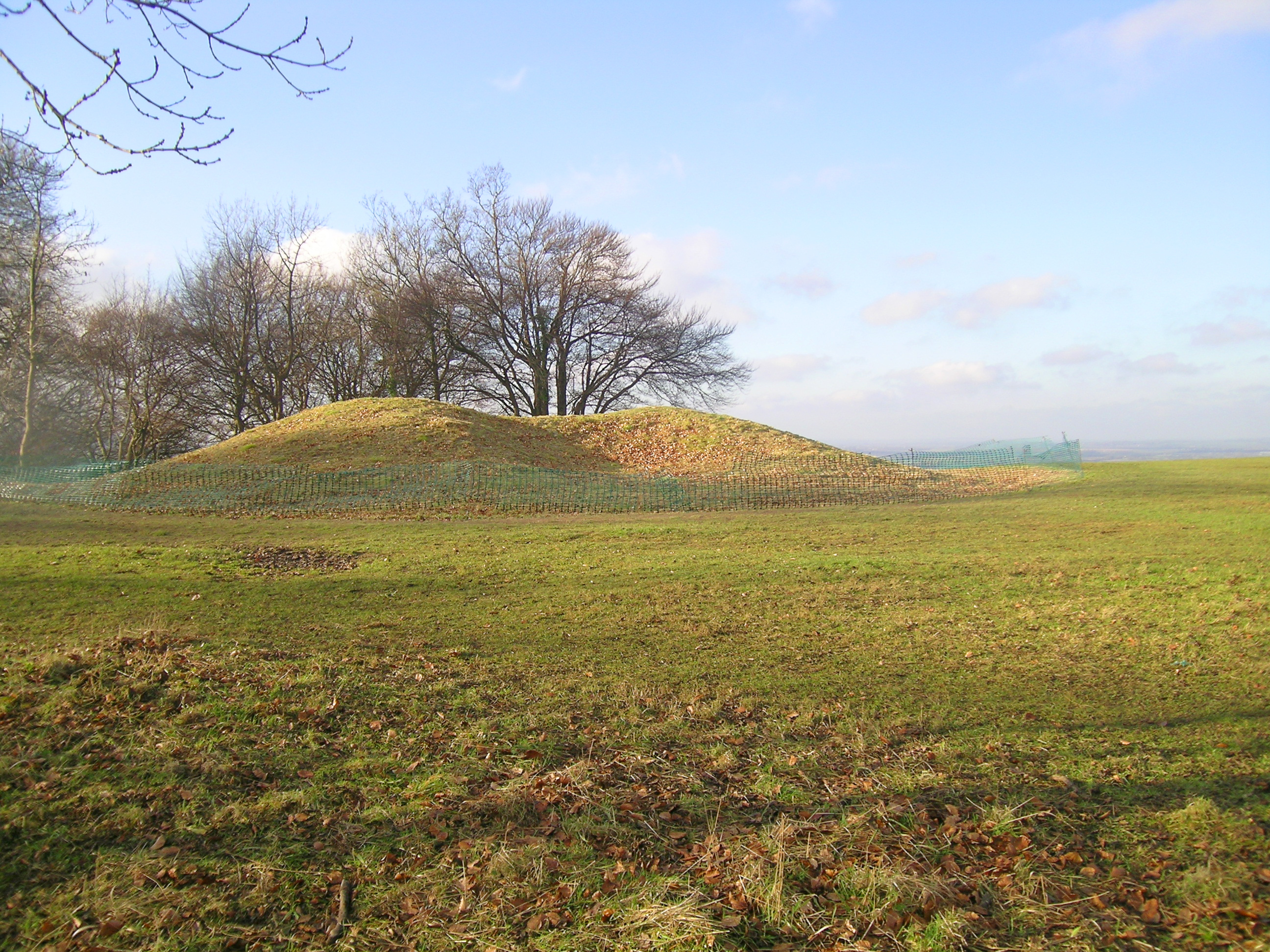
Neolithic Barrow, Whiteleaf Hill

The coat of arms of the former Buckinghamshire County Council features a white mute swan in chains. This dates back to the Anglo-Saxon period, when swans were bred in Buckinghamshire for the king's pleasure. That the swan is in chains illustrates that the swan is bound to the monarch, an ancient law that still applies to wild swans in the UK today. The arms were first borne at the Battle of Agincourt by the Duke of Buckingham.

Above the swan is a gold band, in the centre of which is Whiteleaf Cross, representing the many ancient landmarks of the county. The shield is surmounted by a beech tree, representing the Chiltern Forest that once covered almost half the county. Either side of the shield are a buck, for Buckingham, and a swan, the county symbol.

The motto of the shield is Vestigia Nulla Retrorsum. This is Latin and means 'no stepping back' (or 'no steps backwards').

== Economy ==
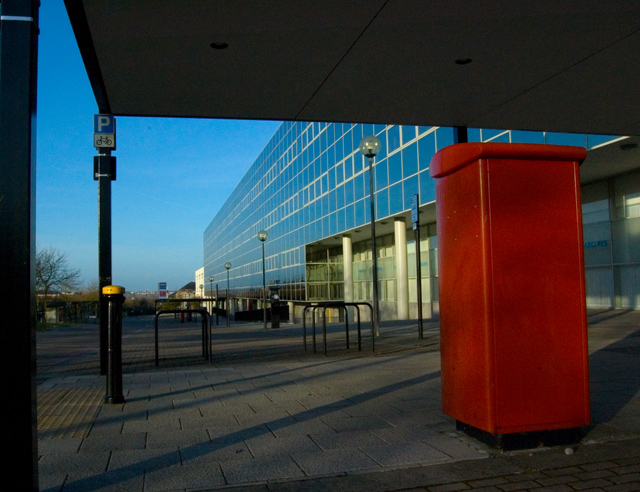
Offices, Milton Keynes

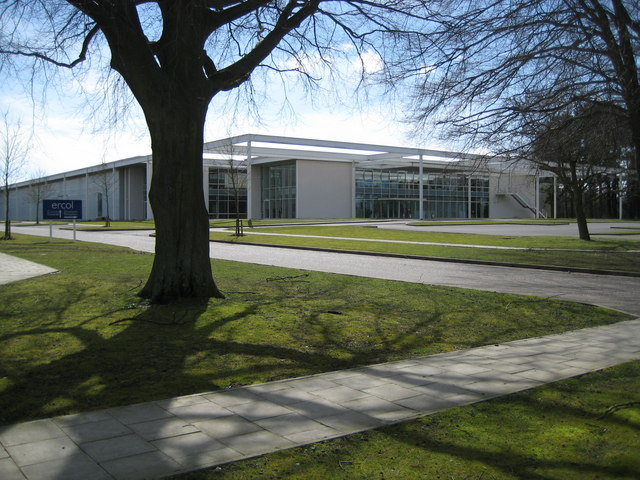
Ercol furniture factory, Princes Risborough

Buckinghamshire has a modern service-based economy and is part of the Berkshire, Buckinghamshire and Oxfordshire NUTS-2 region, which was the seventh richest subregion in the European Union in 2002. As well as the highest GDP per capita outside Inner London, Buckinghamshire has the highest quality of life, the highest life expectancy and the best education results in the country. The southern part of the county is a prosperous section of the London commuter belt. The county has fertile agricultural lands, with many landed estates, especially those of the Rothschild banking family of England in the 19th century (see Rothschild properties in England). The county has several annual agricultural shows, with the Bucks County Show established in 1859. Manufacturing industries include furniture-making (traditionally centred at High Wycombe), pharmaceuticals and agricultural processing. Pinewood Studios in Iver Heath is a principal centre of operations for film and TV production in the UK.

This is a chart of trend of regional gross value added of Buckinghamshire at current basic prices published by the Office for National Statistics with figures in millions of Pounds sterling (except GVA index).

Figures in £ millions
Year	Regional Gross Value Added (Note: Components may not sum to totals due to rounding)	Agriculture (Note: includes hunting and forestry)	Industry (Note: includes energy and construction)	Services (Note: includes financial intermediation services indirectly measured)	GVA index per person (Note: UK average index base = 100)
1995	6,008	60	1,746	4,201	118
2000	8,389	45	1,863	6,481	125
2003	9,171	50	1,793	7,328	118

== Places of interest ==
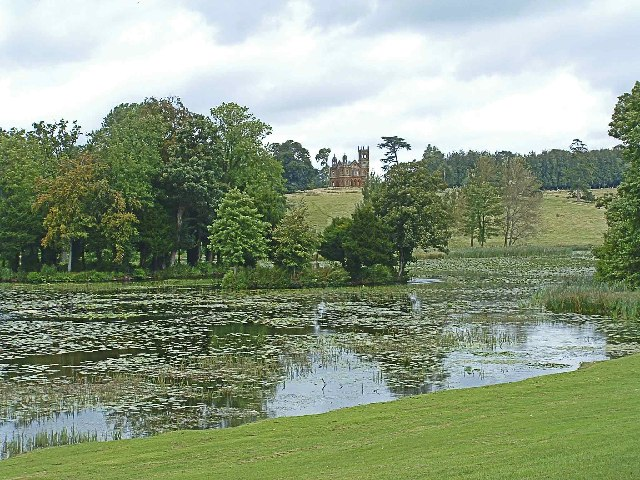
Stowe Landscape Garden

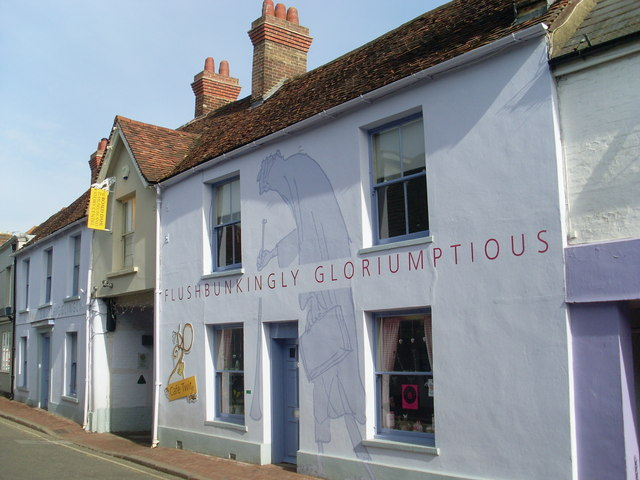
The Roald Dahl Museum and Story Centre, Great Missenden

Buckinghamshire is notable for its open countryside and natural features, including the Chiltern Hills Area of Outstanding Natural Beauty, Stowe Landscaped Gardens near Buckingham, and the River Thames. The Ridgeway Path, a long-distance footpath, passes through the county. The county also has many historic houses. Some of these are opened to the public by the National Trust, such as Waddesdon Manor, West Wycombe Park and Cliveden. Other historic houses are still in use as private homes, such as the Prime Minister's country retreat Chequers.

Claydon House (near Steeple Claydon), Hughenden Manor (near High Wycombe), Stowe Landscaped Gardens, and Waddesdon Manor (near Aylesbury) are in the care of the National Trust.

Mentmore Towers, a 19th-century English country house built by the Rothschilds is located the village of Mentmore. It is the largest of the English Rothschild houses and is known for its Jacobean-styled architecture designed by Joseph Paxton.

Bletchley Park in Milton Keynes is the site of World War II British codebreaking and Colossus, the world's first programmable electronic digital computer. Together with the co-located National Museum of Computing, it is a nationally important visitor attraction.

Examples of historical architecture in the Chiltern region are preserved at the Chiltern Open Air Museum, an open-air folk museum near Chalfont St Giles. The 45-acre (180,000 m^{2}) site contains reconstructed buildings which might otherwise have been destroyed or demolished as a result of redevelopment or road construction.

The market town of Olney, in the Milton Keynes UA, is home to Cowper and Newton Museum which celebrates the work and lives of two famous figures: William Cowper (1731–1800) a celebrated 18th-century poet; and John Newton, a prominent slave trade abolitionist who was curate in the local church. Together, Cowper and Newton wrote the Olney Hymns, including one of the world's most popular hymns, Amazing Grace.

Buckinghamshire is the home of various notable people in connection with whom tourist attractions have been established: for example the author Roald Dahl who included many local features and characters in his works. Artists William Callow and Harriet Anne Smart Callow produced many paintings of the area in the late 19th century.

Sports facilities in Buckinghamshire include half of the international Silverstone Circuit which straddles the Buckinghamshire and Northamptonshire border, the Adams Park Stadium in the south and Stadium MK in the north, and Dorney Lake (named 'Eton Dorney' for the event) was used as the rowing venue for the 2012 Summer Olympics.

== Media ==
The county is covered by three overlapping TV regions

- BBC South and ITV Meridian (for the Thames Valley) covering the western side of the county,
- BBC East and ITV Anglia, covering the north and east of the county, and
- BBC London and ITV London, covering the south of the county.

Local radio stations are BBC Three Counties Radio, BBC Radio Berkshire (covering Marlow), Heart Thames Valley (now Heart South), Heart Four Counties (now Heart East), Greatest Hits Radio Bucks, Beds and Herts (formerly Mix 96) and Wycombe Sound (covering High Wycombe).

== Transport ==
=== Roads ===
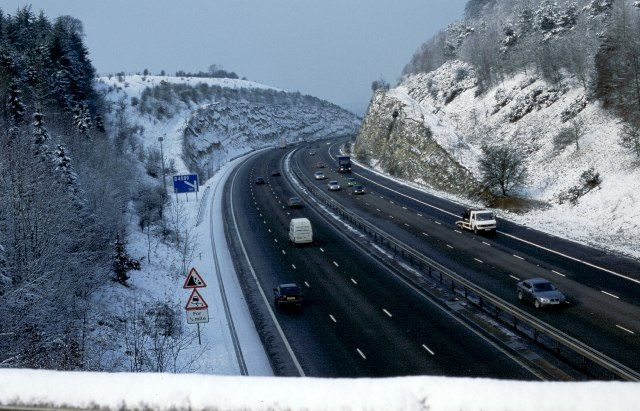
The M40 in the Chilterns

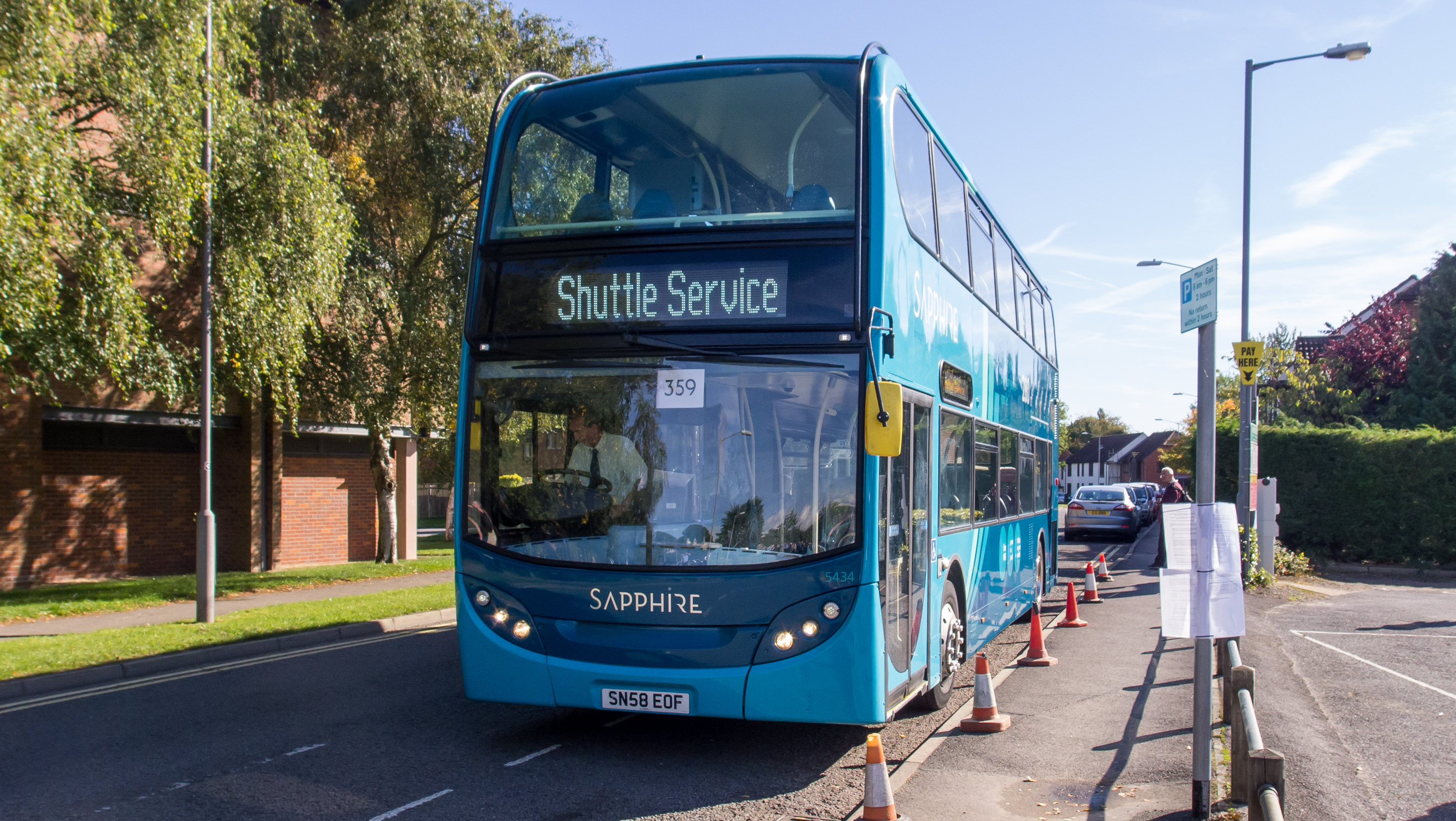
Local bus, Amersham

Buckinghamshire is served by four motorways, although two are on its borders:

- M1 motorway: serves Milton Keynes in the north via junctions 13 and 14 (although the former is just outside the county boundary in Bedfordshire).
- M25 motorway: passes into Bucks but has only one junction (J16-interchange for the M40).
- M4 motorway: passes through the very south of the county with only J7 in Bucks.
- M40 motorway: cuts through the south of the county serving towns such as High Wycombe and Beaconsfield.

Six important A roads also enter the county:

- A4: briefly passes through the county on its way from London to Bristol.
- A40: the old London to Oxford road still passes through Gerrards Cross, Beaconsfield, and High Wycombe, whilst through traffic now uses the M40 that runs parallel to it.
- A41: the old London to Birkenhead road cuts through the centre of the county, passing directly through Aylesbury.
- A421: serves Milton Keynes and Buckingham; links the M1 to the M40.
- A5: serves Milton Keynes.
- A509: serves the north of the county, starting at the A5 near Central Milton Keynes, heading north-east via M1 J14 through Olney, eventually leaving the county at Warrington for Wellingborough and Kettering.

Also less important primary A roads enter the county:

- A404: serves Marlow and High Wycombe.
- A413; Denham – Towcester (Northants) via Aylesbury and Buckingham
- A418: Thame (Oxon) – Leighton Buzzard (Beds) via Aylesbury
- A428: has a very small section through the county, serving the northern villages of Lavendon and Cold Brayfield.
- A4010: M40 J4 (High Wycombe) – Stoke Mandeville.
- A4146: Leighton Buzzard (Bedfordshire) – Milton Keynes.

=== Rail ===
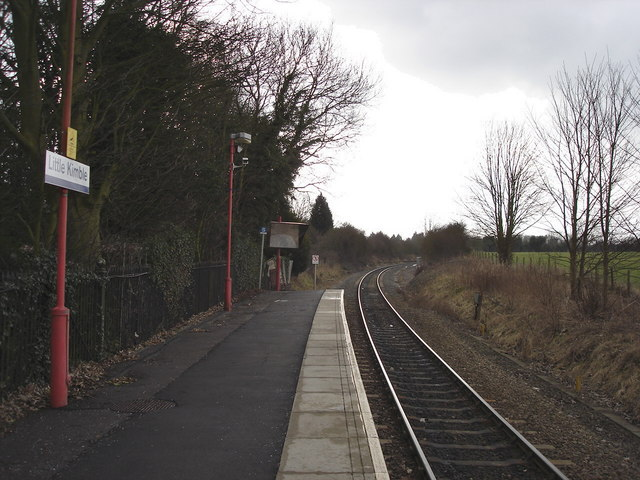
Little Kimble railway station, a typical rural village halt on the Aylesbury–Princes Risborough line

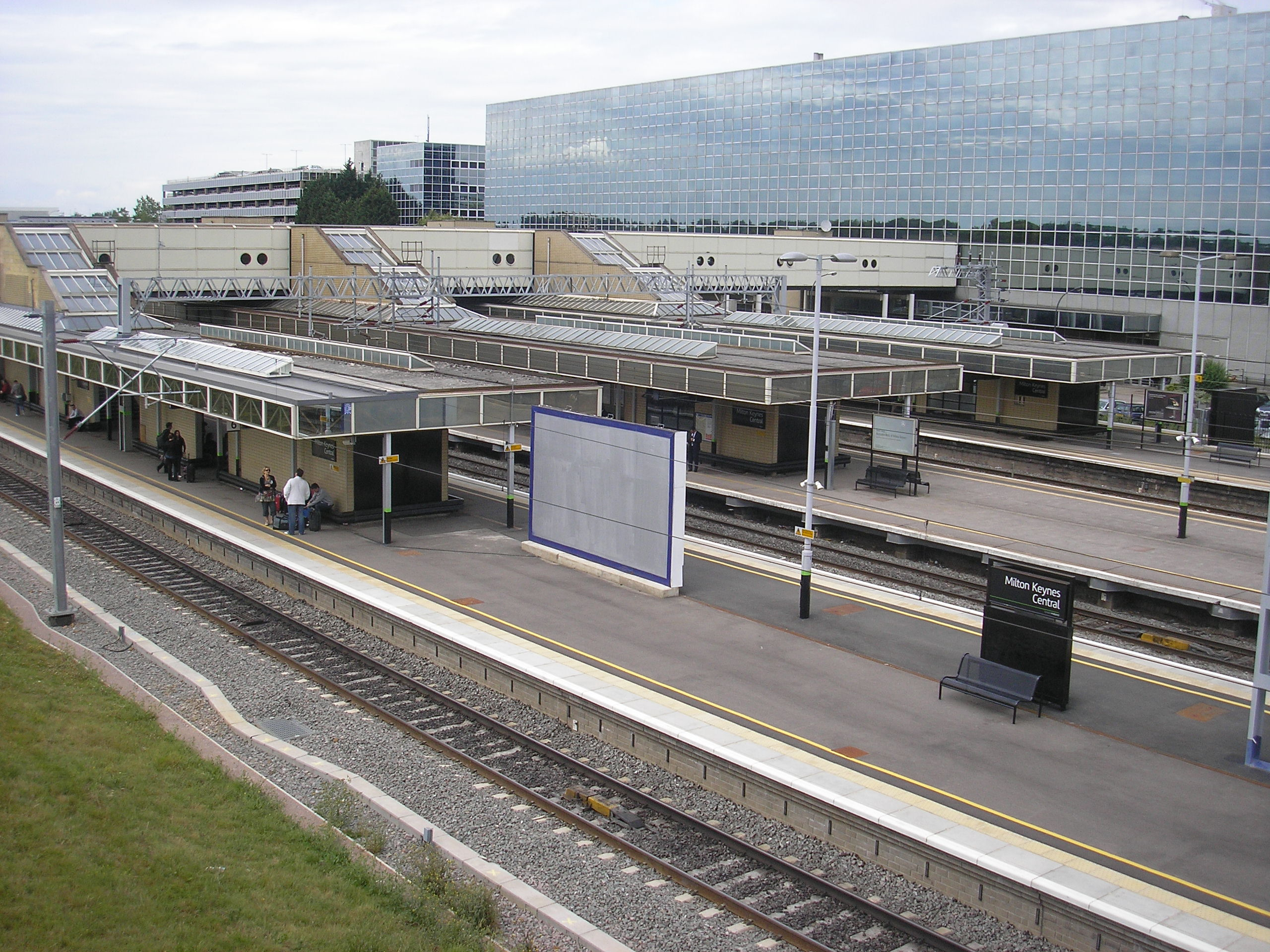
Milton Keynes Central railway station provides intercity and commuter services on the West Coast Main Line

As part of the London commuter belt, Buckinghamshire is well connected to the national rail network, with both local commuter and inter-city services serving some destinations.

Chiltern Railways is a principal train operating company in Buckinghamshire, providing the majority of local commuter services from the centre and south of the county, with trains running into London Marylebone. Great Western operates commuter services from Taplow and Iver into London Paddington. West Midlands Trains provides these services from Milton Keynes Central into Euston or Birmingham New Street, and Southern operates commuter services via the West London Line from Milton Keynes Central to East Croydon.

Avanti West Coast operates inter-city services from Milton Keynes Central to Euston, North West England, the West Midlands, the Scottish Central Belt, and North Wales. Great Western operates non-stop services through the south of the county from Paddington to South West England and South Wales.

There are four main lines running through the county:

- The West Coast Main Line in the north of the county serves stations in Milton Keynes
- London–Aylesbury line serves Aylesbury and other settlements along the A413 towards London. Once part of the Metropolitan line of London Underground, which now runs to Amersham
- Chiltern Main Line: serves the towns along the M40 motorway including High Wycombe and Beaconsfield
- Great Western Main Line: runs through Slough. Slough is now in Berkshire, but the line enters Bucks twice, on either side of Slough, with Taplow and Iver both having stations in Buckinghamshire.

There are the following additional lines:

- Princes Risborough to Aylesbury Line: a single track branch that connects the Chiltern Main Line to the London to Aylesbury Line.
- Marston Vale Line: between Bletchley and Bedford. This is a remnant of the former Varsity Line between Oxford and Cambridge
- Marlow Branch Line: between Marlow, Bourne End and Maidenhead.
- Metropolitan line: between Amersham and Chesham to London
- Chinnor and Princes Risborough Railway, a preserved railway.
- The new Elizabeth line (constructed as Crossrail) serves Iver.

As of 2021, contractors are working on behalf of the East West Rail Company to reinstate the route between Oxford and Bletchley via Winslow, enabling services to Milton Keynes Central from 2025. The line between Aylesbury and Claydon Junction may also be reinstated in the same programme, enabling services between Aylesbury and Milton Keynes, but this option is not programmed. Construction of High Speed 2 is also underway and is planned to run non-stop through the county at some future date.

== Settlements ==
Largest built-up areas in ceremonial Buckinghamshire (2011 census)
Built-up area	Population (2011)	Local Authority	Notes
Milton Keynes	229,941	City of Milton Keynes	Includes the 1967 'designated development area' of Milton Keynes in addition to the towns of Newport Pagnell and Woburn Sands (which were outside the 1967 boundary), as well as Bletchley, Fenny Stratford, Wolverton and Stony Stratford (which were within it). Central Milton Keynes, the city centre, is a civil parish with a town council. The built-up area extends into Bedfordshire via the contiguous civil parishes of Aspley Guise and Aspley Heath.
High Wycombe	133,204	Buckinghamshire	Includes suburbs of Downley and Hazlemere.
Aylesbury	74,748	Buckinghamshire	County town of Buckinghamshire. Population of Aylesbury built-up area includes Stoke Mandeville and Bierton
Amersham/Chesham	46,122	Buckinghamshire	The Amersham/Chesham built-up area includes both Amersham and Chesham.
Gerrards Cross	20,633	Buckinghamshire	Includes Chalfont St Peter. The area lacks town status but is the 5th largest conurbation in the county.
Marlow	18,261	Buckinghamshire	
Beaconsfield	13,797	Buckinghamshire	
Buckingham	12,890	Buckinghamshire	Historically the county town of Buckinghamshire
Princes Risborough	8,231	Buckinghamshire	
Wendover	7,702	Buckinghamshire	
Olney	6,477	City of Milton Keynes	
Chalfont St Giles	7,957	Buckinghamshire	Built-up area includes Seer Green and Jordans
Prestwood	7,501	Buckinghamshire	Built-up area includes Great Missenden
Winslow	4,407	Buckinghamshire	

For the full list of towns, villages and hamlets in Buckinghamshire, see List of places in Buckinghamshire. Throughout history, there have been changes to the Buckinghamshire boundary.

== Education ==
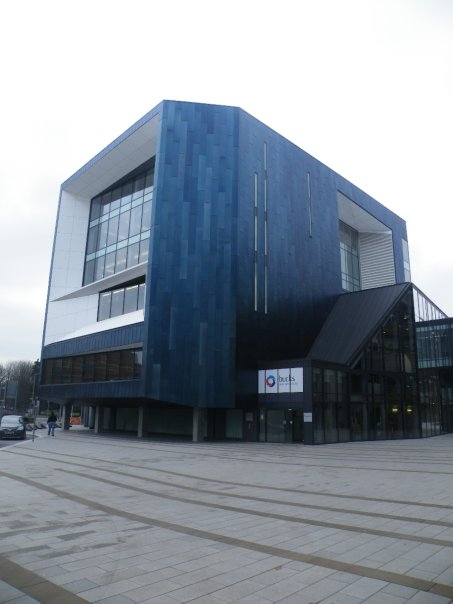
The Gateway Building, Buckinghamshire New University, High Wycombe.

Artist and composer Harriet Anne Smart started a school in Buckinghamshire in the 1850s to teach local labourers how to read. Today, education in Buckinghamshire is governed by two Local Education Authorities, Buckinghamshire Council and Milton Keynes City Council. Buckinghamshire Council is one of the few remaining LEAs still using the tripartite system, albeit with some revisions such as the abolition of secondary technical schools. It has a completely selective education system: pupils transfer either to a grammar school or to a secondary modern school or free school depending on how they perform in the Eleven-Plus exam and on their preferences. Pupils who do not take the test can only be allocated places at secondary modern schools or free school. There are 9 independent schools and 34 maintained (state) secondary schools, not including sixth form colleges, in the county council area. There is also the Buckinghamshire University Technical College which offers secondary education from age 14. The unitary authority of Milton Keynes operates a comprehensive education system: there are 8 maintained (state) secondary schools in the City Council area.

Buckinghamshire is also home to the University of Buckingham, Buckinghamshire New University, the National Film and Television School, and the Open University. The University of Bedfordshire has a campus in Milton Keynes.

== Notable people ==
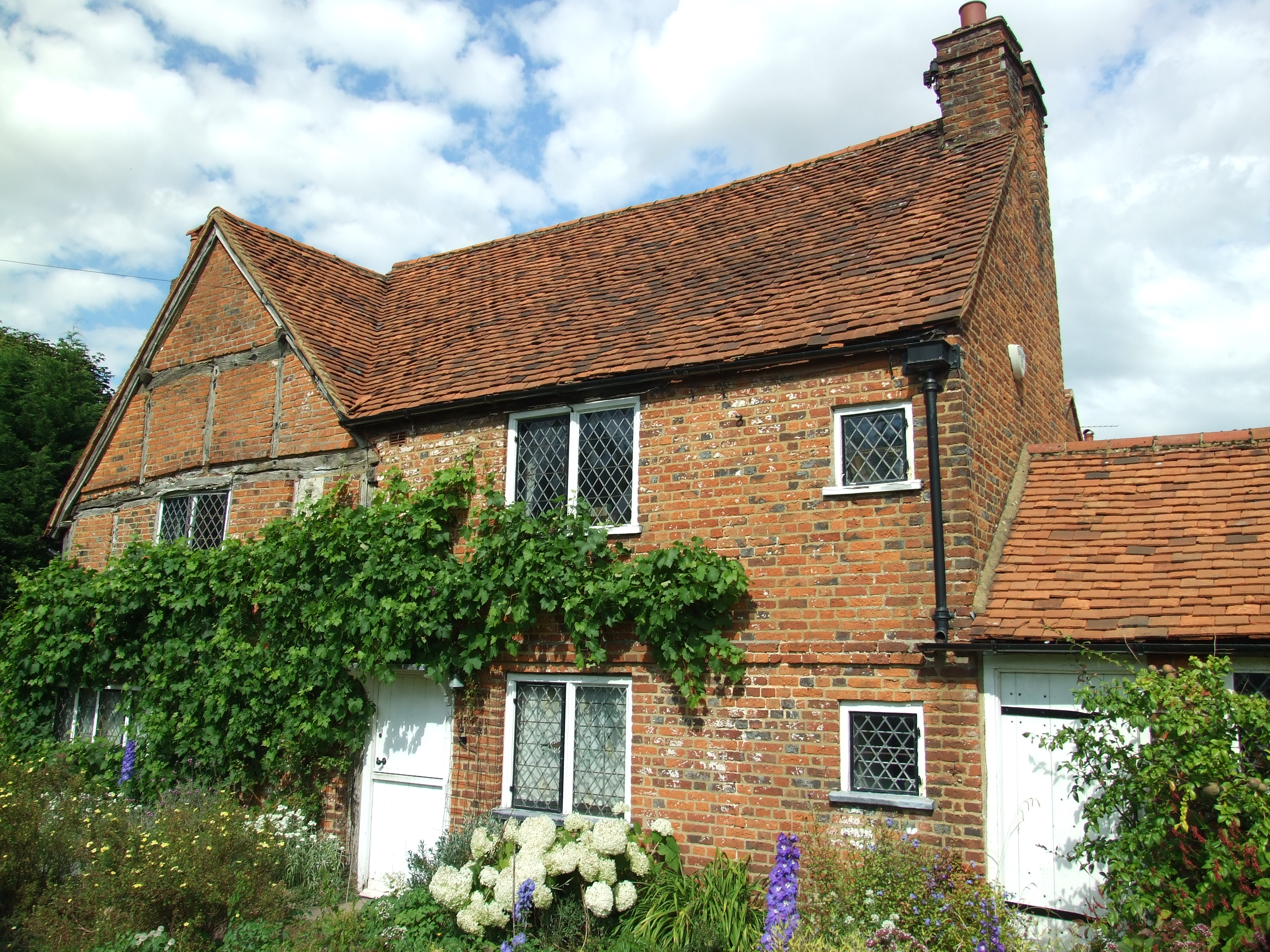
John Milton's cottage, Chalfont

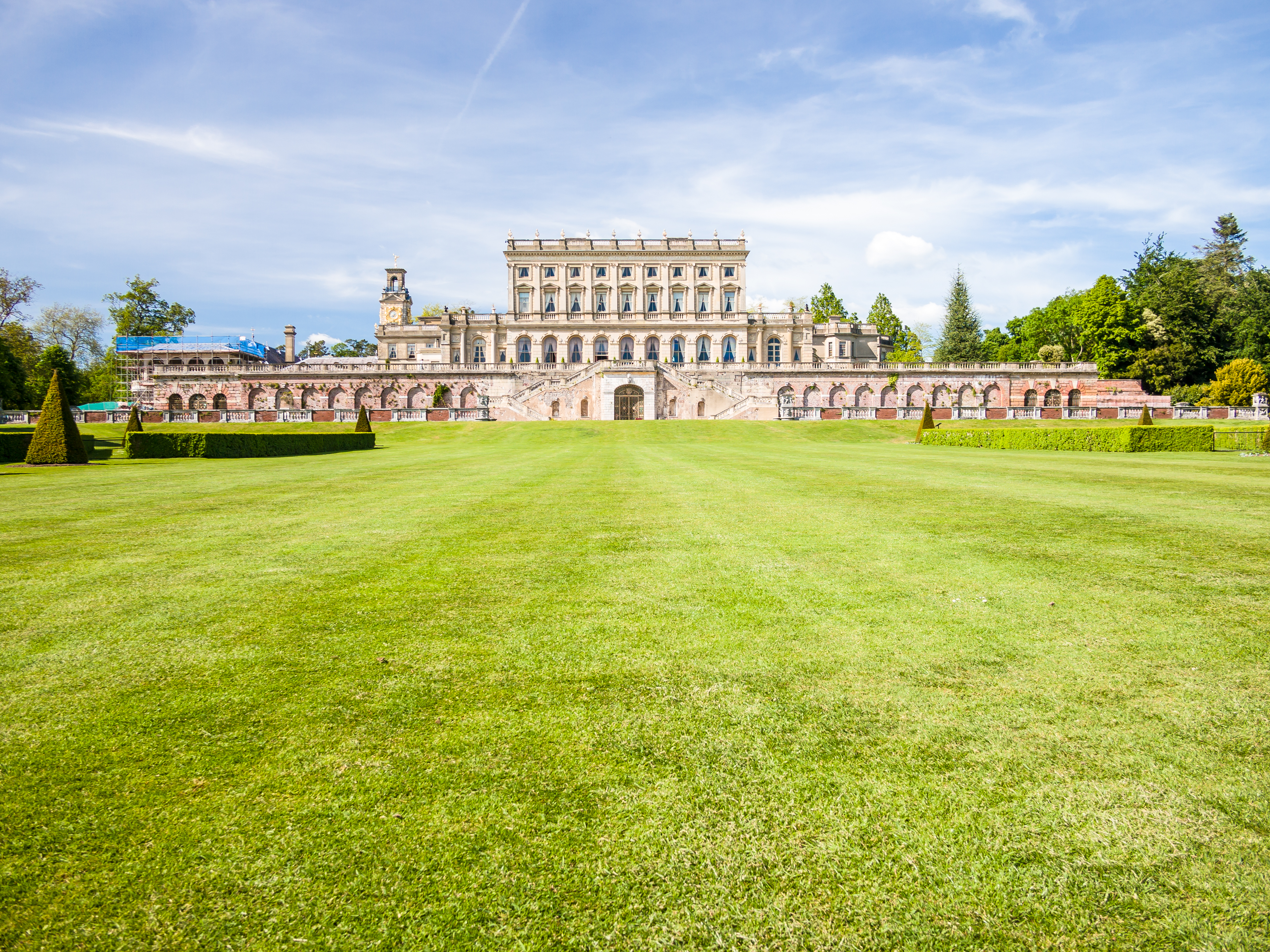
Cliveden

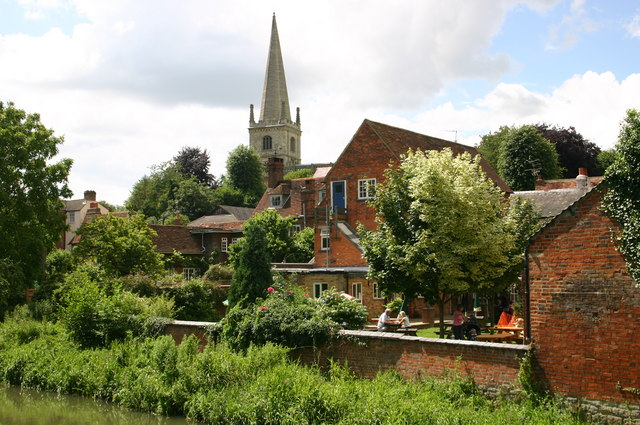
Buckingham church seen from across the Ouse

Buckinghamshire is the birthplace and/or final resting place of several notable individuals. St Osyth was born in Quarrendon and was buried in Aylesbury in the 7th century while at about the same time Saint Rumbold (or Rumwald) was buried in Buckingham. In the medieval period, Roger of Wendover and Anne Boleyn also owned property in the same town. It is said that King Henry VIII made Aylesbury the county town in preference to Buckingham because Boleyn's father owned property there and was a regular visitor himself. Other medieval residents included Edward the Confessor, who had a palace at Brill, and John Wycliffe who lived in Ludgershall.

Buckinghamshire later became home to some notable literary characters. Edmund Waller was brought up in Beaconsfield and served as Member of Parliament (MP) for both Amersham and Wycombe. Mary Shelley and her husband Percy Bysshe Shelley lived for some time in Marlow, attracted to the town by their friend Thomas Love Peacock who also lived there. John Milton lived in Chalfont St Giles and his cottage can still be visited there and John Wilkes was MP for Aylesbury. Later authors include Jerome K. Jerome who lived at Marlow, T. S. Eliot who also lived at Marlow, Roald Dahl who lived at Great Missenden, Enid Blyton who lived in Beaconsfield and Edgar Wallace who lived at Bourne End and is buried in Little Marlow. Modern-day writers from Bucks include Terry Pratchett who was born in Beaconsfield, Tim Rice who is from Amersham and Andy Riley who is from Aylesbury.

During the Second World War a number of European politicians and statesmen were exiled in England. Many of these settled in Bucks as it is close to London. President Edvard Beneš of Czechoslovakia lived at Aston Abbotts with his family while some of his officials were stationed at nearby Addington and Wingrave. Meanwhile, Władysław Sikorski, military leader of Poland, lived at Iver and King Zog of Albania lived at Frieth. Much earlier, King Louis XVIII of France lived in exile at Hartwell House from 1809 to 1814.

Also on the local political stage Buckinghamshire has been home to Nancy Astor who lived in Cliveden, Frederick, Prince of Wales who also lived in Cliveden, Baron Carrington who lives in Bledlow, Benjamin Disraeli who lived at Hughenden Manor and was made Earl of Beaconsfield, John Hampden who was from Great Hampden and is revered in Aylesbury to this day and Prime Minister Archibald Primrose, 5th Earl of Rosebery who lived at Mentmore. Also worthy of note are William Penn who believed he was descended from the Penn family of Penn and so is buried nearby and the current Prime Minister of the United Kingdom, who has an official residence at Chequers. John Archdale, the colonial governor of North Carolina and South Carolina, was born in Buckinghamshire.

Other notable natives of Buckinghamshire include:

- Amber Bain, musician, known as The Japanese House
- John Athawes, cricketer, was born in Loughton, Milton Keynes
- Errol Barnett, news reporter, was born in Milton Keynes
- Nick Beggs, musician, is from Winslow
- Lynda Bellingham, actress, was from Aylesbury
- Emily Bergl, actress, born in Milton Keynes, though her family moved to suburban Chicago a few years after her birth
- Emmerson Boyce, Wigan Athletic footballer, was born in Aylesbury
- Nick Bracegirdle aka Chicane, was born in Chalfont St Giles
- Den Brotheridge, British Army Officer who died taking Pegasus Bridge in France was from Aylesbury
- Charles Butler, pastor, grammarian, and pioneering beekeeper was born in the county
- Giles Cooper, entertainment producer, best known for Royal Variety Performance was born in Amersham, brought up in High Wycombe
- James Corden, actor, grew up in Hazlemere
- John Crowder (1756–1830), alderman of the ward of Farringdon Within, and Lord Mayor of London
- Lucinda Dryzek, actress, born in High Wycombe
- Emma Ferreira English contemporary artist, sculptor, photographer, entrepreneur and philanthropist
- Jack Garratt, singer-songwriter, is from Little Chalfont
- Martin Grech, musician, is from Aylesbury
- Julian Haviland, former Political Editor of both ITN and The Times newspaper, was born and brought up in Iver Heath in Iver
- James Marriott, musician and online content creator
- Howard Jones, musician, attended Royal Grammar School
- Prince Michael of Kent, member of the British royal family, born in Iver in south Bucks
- Arthur Lasenby Liberty, merchant, was from Chesham
- Richard Lee, footballer, attended Aylesbury Grammar School
- Bob Leith, musician, attended Lord Grey Comprehensive in Milton Keynes
- Jonathon Lewis, England test cricketer, was born in Aylesbury
- Al Murray, television/radio presenter also known as The Pub Landlord originates from Stewkley
- John Otway, musician, is from Aylesbury
- Leigh-Anne Pinnock, singer and member of 2011 X-Factor winning girl group Little Mix, born in High Wycombe
- Matt Phillips, footballer playing for Queens Park Rangers F.C., was born in Aylesbury
- Dominic Raab, politician, Conservative Party Member of Parliament (MP) and former Foreign Secretary, grew up in Gerrards Cross and attended Dr Challoner's Grammar School in Amersham
- Steve Redgrave, five-time Olympic gold medallist rower is from Marlow Bottom
- George Gilbert Scott, architect famous for his numerous Gothic revival buildings, born in Gawcott
- Simon Standage, Baroque violinist, is from High Wycombe
- Justin Sullivan, musician with New Model Army
- Michael York, actor, born in Fulmer in south Bucks

== See also ==
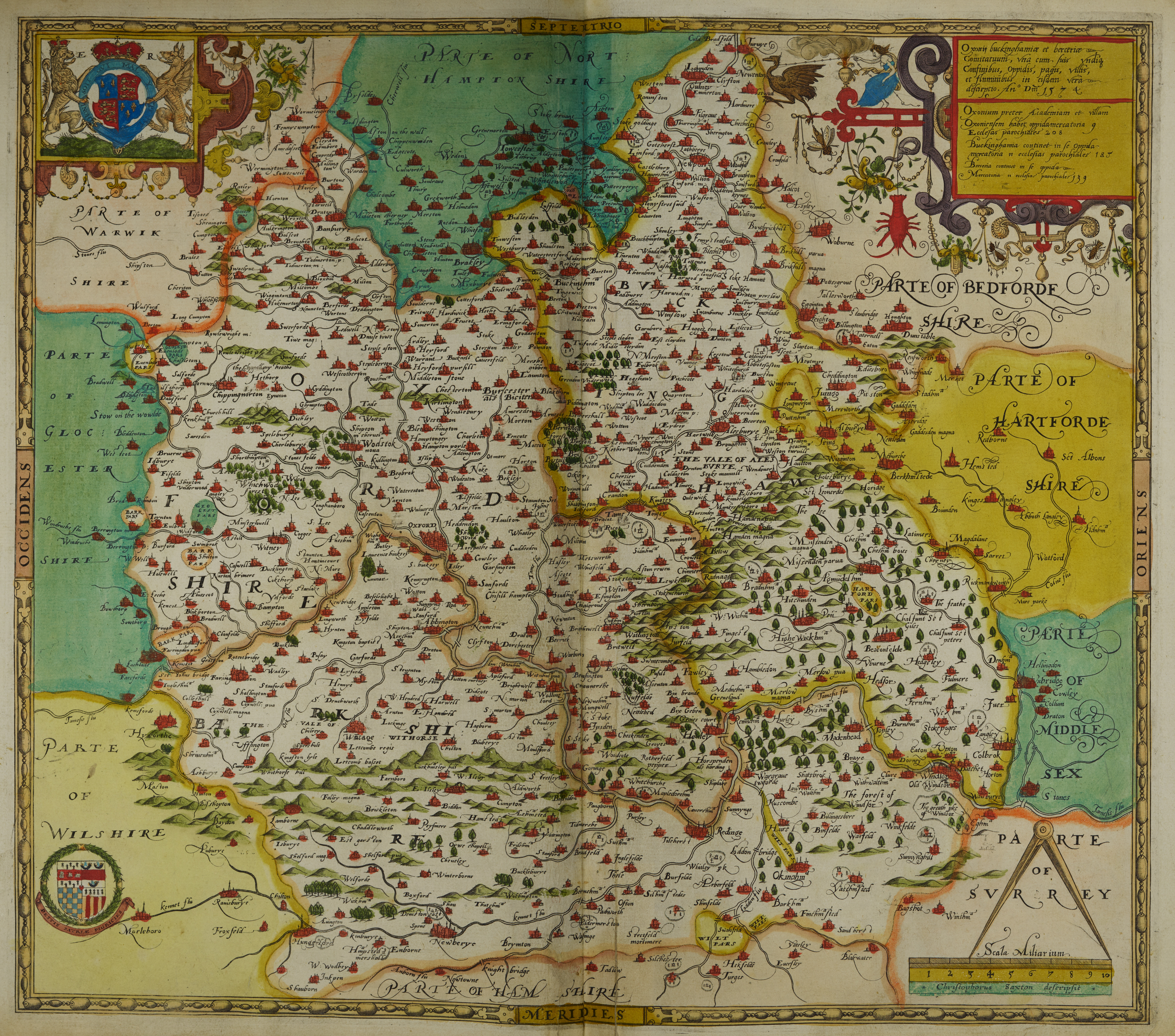
Hand-drawn map of Oxford, Buckinghamshire and Berkshire by Christopher Saxton from 1576.

- Architecture of Aylesbury
- Bucks County, Pennsylvania
- Centre for Buckinghamshire Studies
- Duke of Buckingham
- List of English and Welsh endowed schools in Buckinghamshire
- Safety Centre
- Wendover Woods

== Sources ==
- Baynes, T. S., ed. (1878), "County of Buckingham" , Encyclopædia Britannica, vol. 4 (9th ed.), New York: Charles Scribner's Sons, pp. 415–417
