= Safety Town =

Safety education program for children

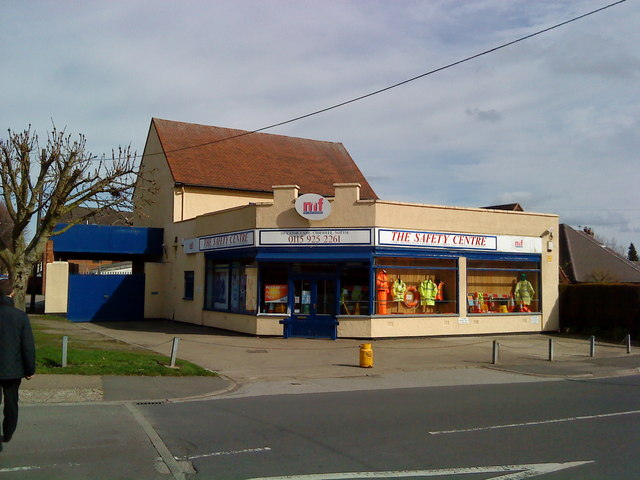
The Safety Centre

Safety Town is an American program for children that teaches safety lessons about fire, pedestrians/traffic, water, guns, and poisons/drugs. It is also the name given to a replica town created to instruct children about safety measures.

It may include a traffic park in which children can train and learn road traffic safety.

The Safety Town program was founded by Officer Frend Boals in Mansfield, Ohio, in 1937 after a child was struck and killed by a car on his way to school; the National Safety Town Center was founded in 1964 by Dorothy Chlad in Cleveland, Ohio.

== See also ==
- Safety Town (Huntington, West Virginia)
