= Fire safety =

Practices to reduce the results of fire

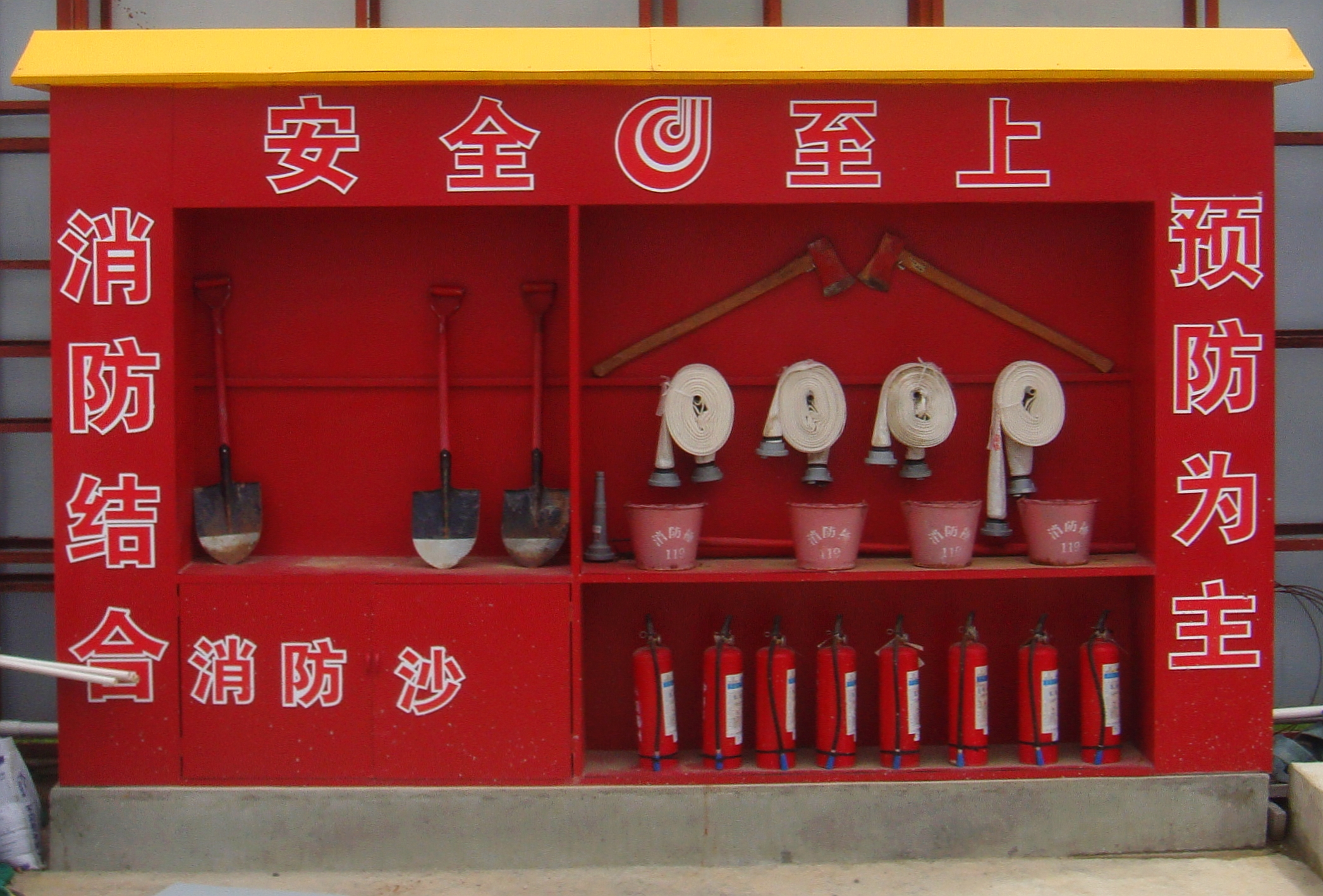
Fire safety equipment at a construction site in China

Fire safety is the set of practices intended to reduce destruction caused by fire. Fire safety measures include those that are intended to prevent the ignition of an uncontrolled fire and those that are used to limit the spread and impact of a fire.

Fire safety measures include those that are planned during the construction of a building or implemented in structures that are already standing and those that are taught or provided to occupants of the building.

Threats to fire safety are commonly referred to as fire hazards. A fire hazard may include a situation that increases the likelihood of a fire or may impede escape in the event a fire occurs.

Fire safety is often a component of building safety. Those who inspect buildings for violations of the fire codes, and visit schools to educate children on fire safety topics, are fire department members known as Fire Prevention Officers. The Chief Fire Prevention Officer or Chief of Fire Prevention will normally train newcomers to the Fire Prevention Division and may also conduct inspections or make presentations.

== Elements of a fire safety policy ==
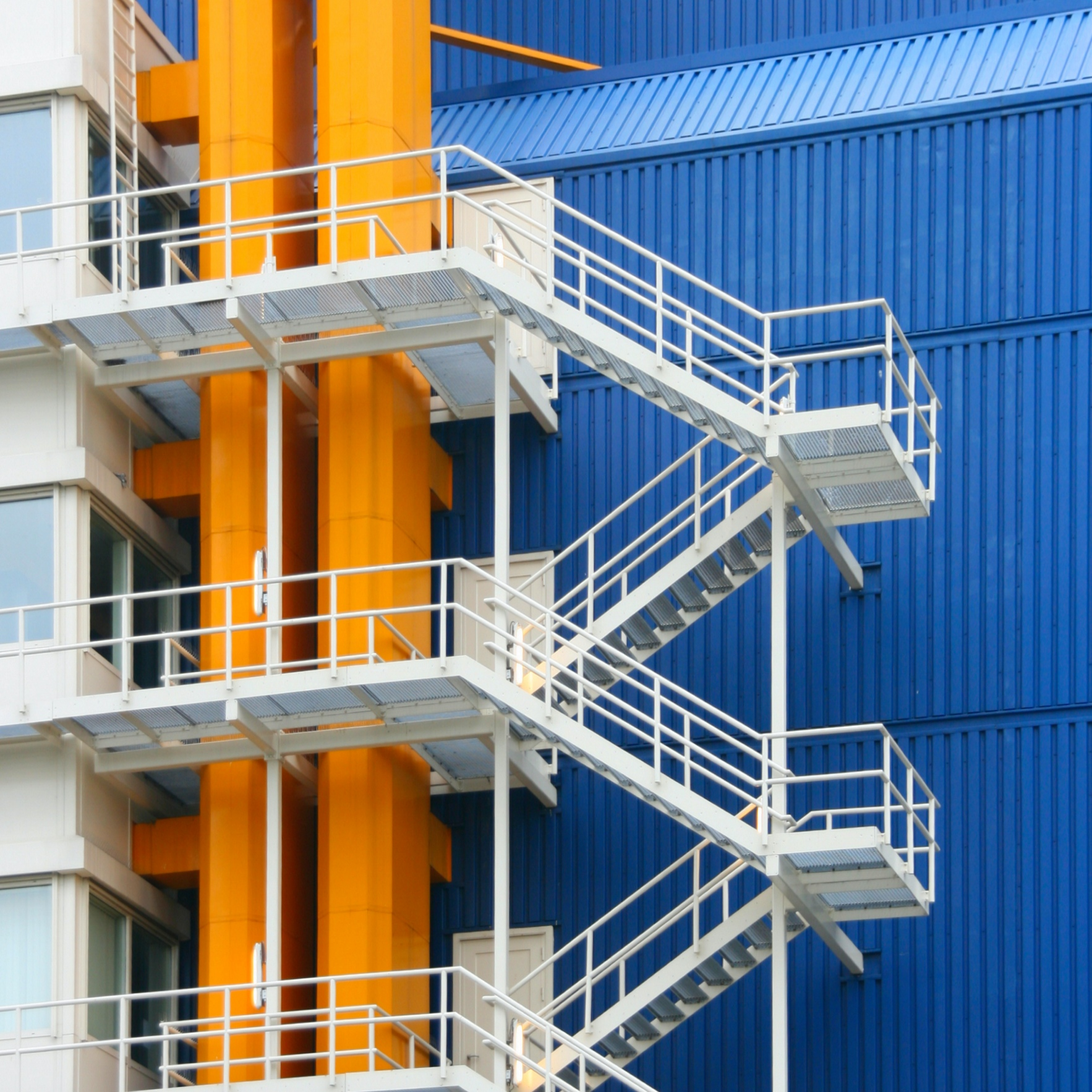
External fire escape stairs in a public building in Netherlands

Fire safety policies apply at the construction of a building and throughout its operating life. Building codes are enacted by local, sub-national, or national governments to ensure such features as adequate fire exits, signage, and construction details such as fire stops and fire rated doors, windows, and walls. Fire safety is also an objective of electrical codes to prevent overheating of wiring or equipment, and to protect from ignition by electrical faults.

Fire codes regulate such requirements as the maximum occupancy for buildings such as theatres or restaurants, for example. Fire codes may require portable fire extinguishers within a building, or may require permanently installed fire detection and suppression equipment such as a fire sprinkler system and a fire alarm system.

Local authorities charged with fire safety may conduct regular inspections for such items as usable fire exit and proper exit signage, functional fire extinguishers of the correct type in accessible places, and proper storage and handling of flammable materials. Depending on local regulations, a fire inspection may result in a notice of required action, or closing of a building until it can be put into compliance with fire code requirements.

Owners and managers of a building may implement additional fire policies. For example, an industrial site may designate and train particular employees as a fire fighting force. Managers must ensure buildings comply with fire evacuation regulations, and that building features such as spray fireproofing remains undamaged. Fire policies may be in place to dictate training and awareness of occupants and users of the building to avoid obvious mistakes, such as the propping open of fire doors. Buildings, especially institutions such as schools, may conduct fire drills at regular intervals throughout the year.

Beyond individual buildings, other elements of fire safety policies may include technologies such as wood coatings, education and prevention, preparedness measures, wildfire detection and suppression, and ensuring geographic coverage of local and sufficient fire extinguishing capacities.

== Common fire hazards ==
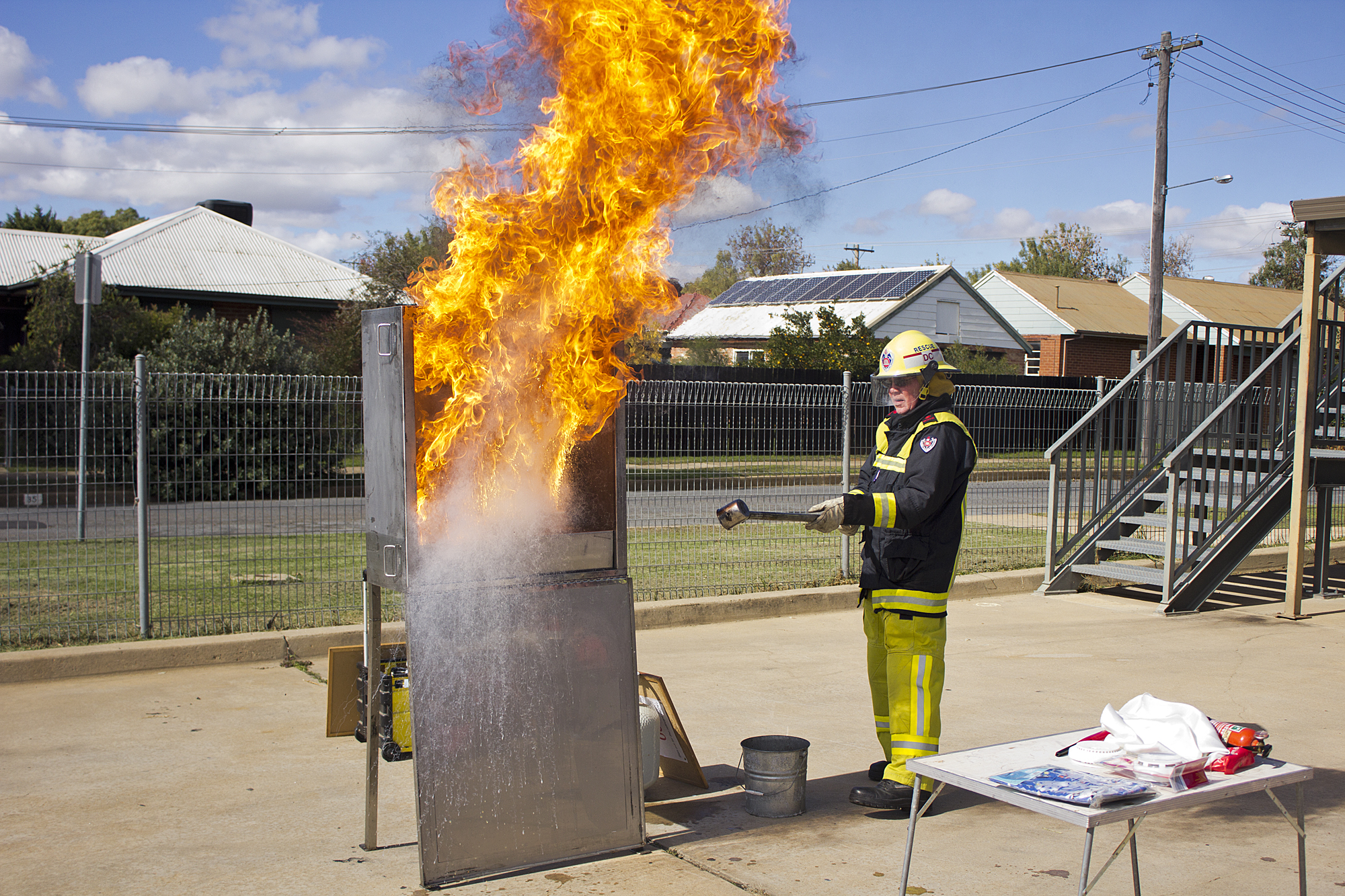
A demonstration of a chip pan fire (125mL, half a cup, of oil) when water is added by Fire and Rescue NSW (video)

Some common fire hazards are:

- Kitchen fires from unattended cooking, grease fires/chip pan fires
- Electrical systems that are overloaded, poorly maintained or defective
- Combustible storage areas with insufficient protection
- Combustibles near equipment that generates heat, flame, or sparks
- Candles and other open flames
- Smoking (Cigarettes, cigars, pipes, lighters, etc.)
- Equipment that generates heat and utilizes combustible materials
- Flammable liquids and aerosols
- Flammable solvents (and rags soaked with solvent) placed in enclosed trash cans
- Fireplace chimneys not properly or regularly cleaned
- Cooking appliances - stoves, ovens
- Heating appliances - fireplaces, wood-burning stoves, furnaces, boilers, portable heaters, solid fuels
- Household appliances - clothes dryers, curling irons, hair dryers, refrigerators, freezers, boilers
- Chimneys that concentrate creosote
- Electrical wiring in poor condition
- Leaking/defective batteries
- Personal ignition sources - matches, lighters
- Electronic and electrical equipment
- Exterior cooking equipment - barbecue

== Fire code ==
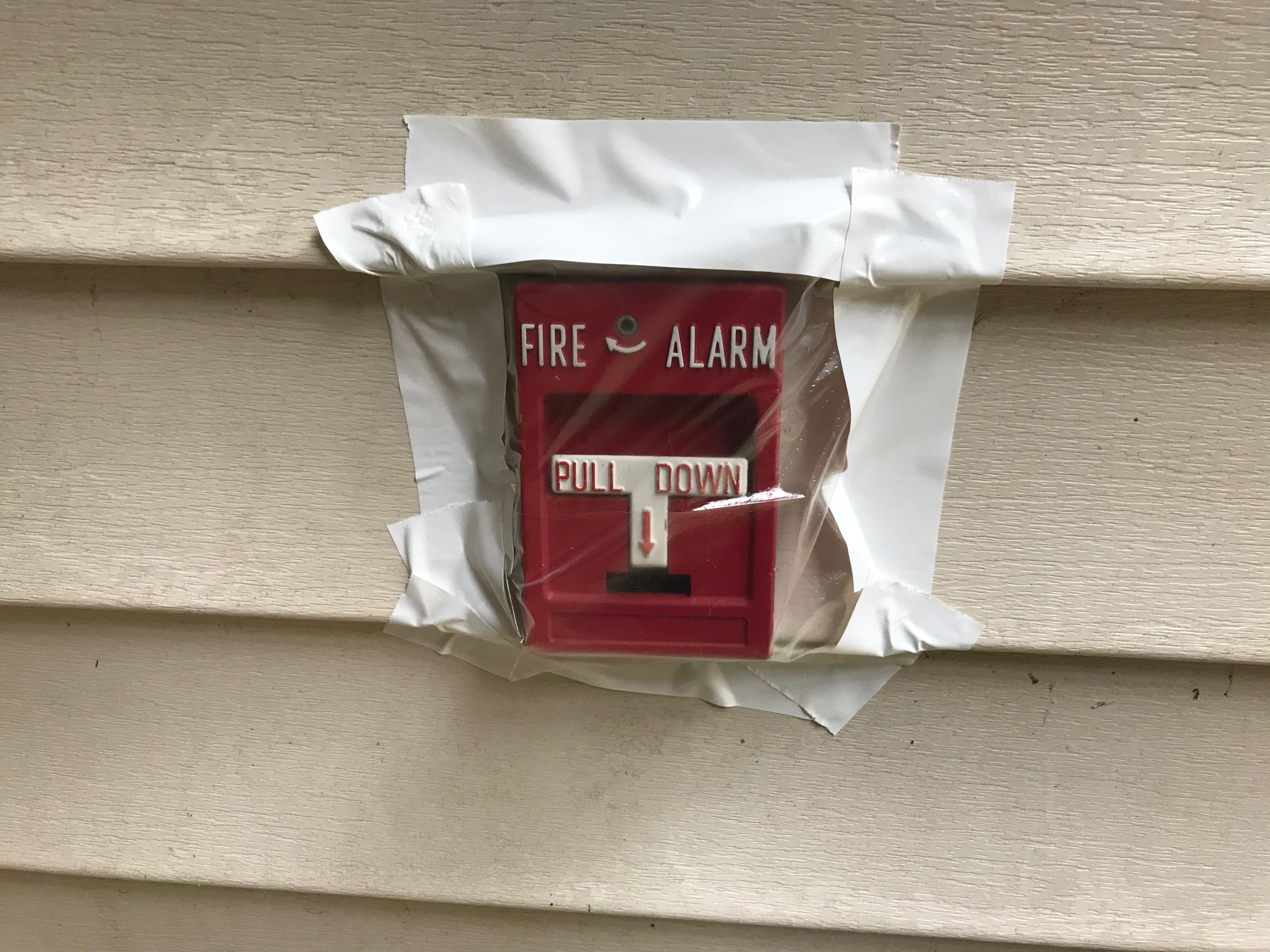
An example of a fire code violation in the United States: the pull station is blocked

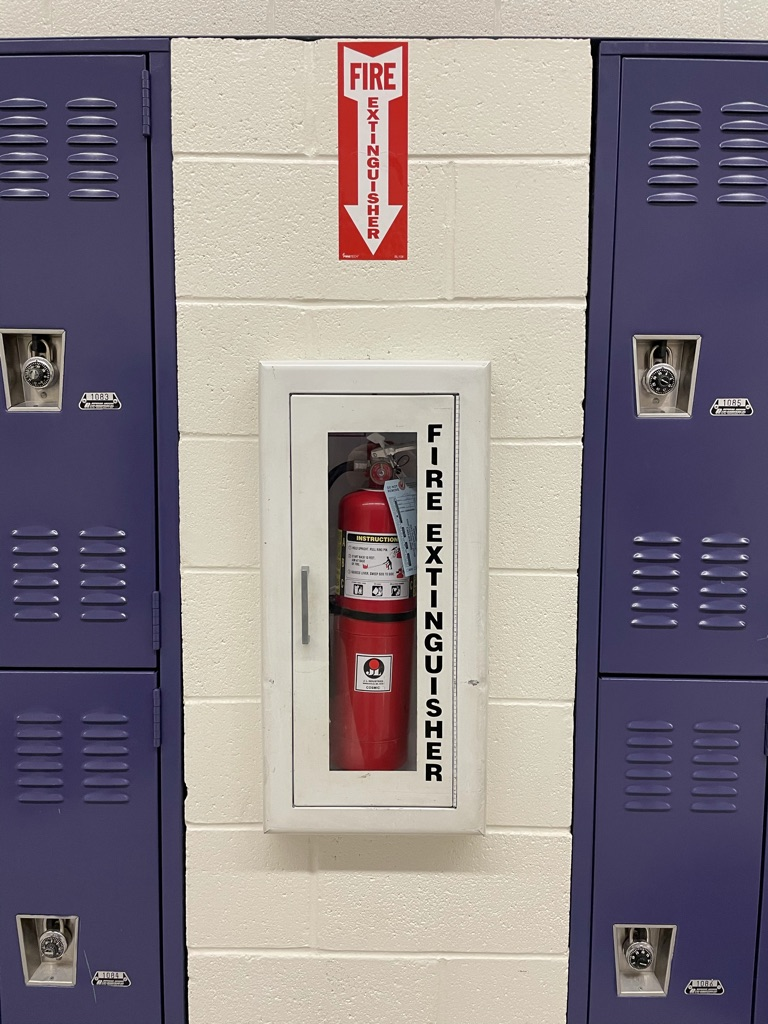
Fire extinguisher in a school

In the United States, the fire code (also fire prevention code or fire safety code) is a model code adopted by the state or local jurisdiction and enforced by fire prevention officers within municipal fire departments. It is a set of rules prescribing minimum requirements to prevent fire and explosion hazards arising from storage, handling, or use of dangerous materials, or from other specific hazardous conditions. It complements the building code. The fire code is aimed primarily at preventing fires, ensuring that necessary training and equipment will be on hand, and that the original design basis of the building, including the basic plan set out by the architect, is not compromised. The fire code also addresses inspection and maintenance requirements of various fire protection equipment in order to maintain optimal active fire protection and passive fire protection measures.

A typical fire safety code includes administrative sections about the rule-making and enforcement process, and substantive sections dealing with fire suppression equipment, particular hazards such as containers and transportation for combustible materials, and specific rules for hazardous occupancies, industrial processes, and exhibitions.

Sections may establish the requirements for obtaining permits and specific precautions required to remain in compliance with a permit. For example, a fireworks exhibition may require an application to be filed by a licensed pyrotechnician, providing the information necessary for the issuing authority to determine whether safety requirements can be met. Once a permit is issued, the same authority (or another delegated authority) may inspect the site and monitor safety during the exhibition, with the power to halt operations, when unapproved practices are seen or when unforeseen hazards arise.

=== List of some typical fire and explosion issues in a fire code ===
- Fireworks, explosives, mortars and cannons, model rockets (licenses for manufacture, storage, transportation, sale, use)
- Certification for servicing, placement, and inspecting fire extinguishing equipment
- General storage and handling of flammable liquids, solids, gases (tanks, personnel training, markings, equipment)
- Limitations on locations and quantities of flammables (e.g., 10 liters of gasoline inside a residential dwelling)
- Specific uses and specific flammables (e.g., dry cleaning, gasoline distribution, explosive dusts, pesticides, space heaters, plastics manufacturing)
- Permits and limitations in various building occupancies (assembly hall, hospital, school, theater, elderly care, child care centers) that require a smoke detector, sprinkler system, fire extinguisher, or other specific equipment or procedures
- Removal of interior and exterior obstructions to emergency exits or firefighters and removal of hazardous materials
- Permits and limitations in special outdoor applications (tents, asphalt kettles, bonfires, etc.)
- Other hazards (flammable decorations, welding, smoking, bulk matches, tire yards)
- Electrical safety codes such as the National Electrical Code (by the National Fire Protection Association) for the U.S. and some other places in the Americas
- Fuel gas code
- Car fire

== Public fire safety education ==
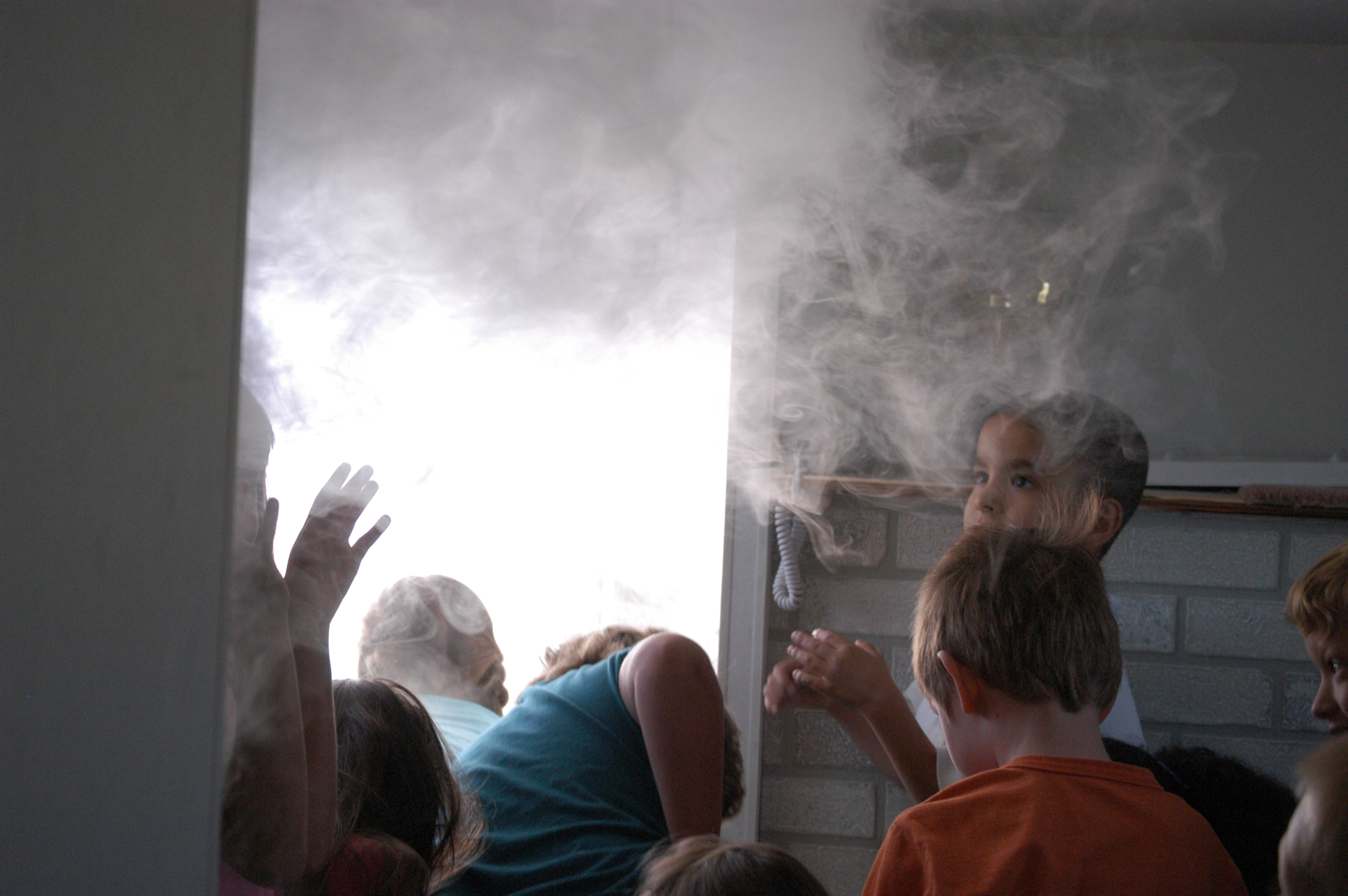
Children evacuating a smoky building as a way to learn fire safety

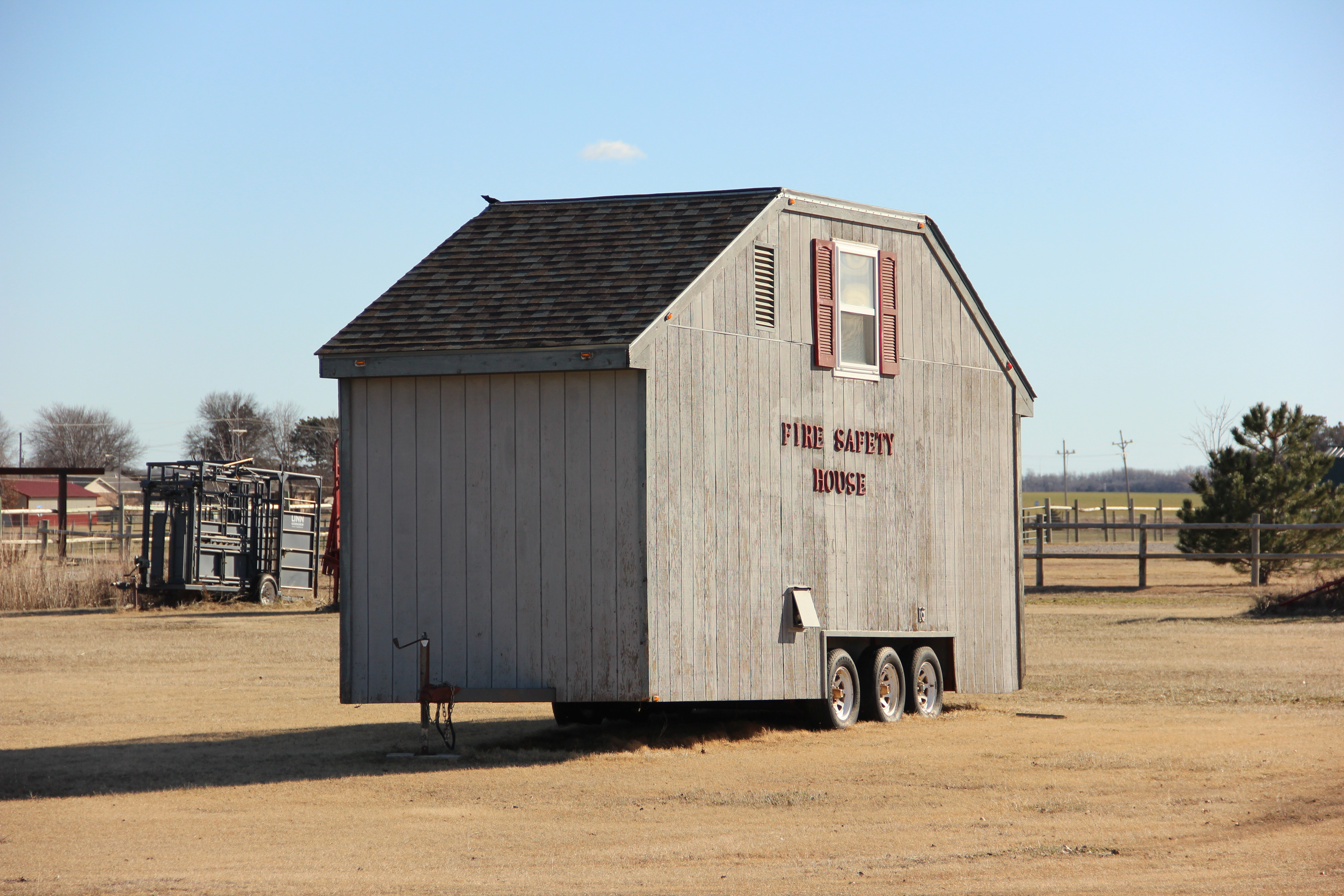
Fire safety house for fire simulations

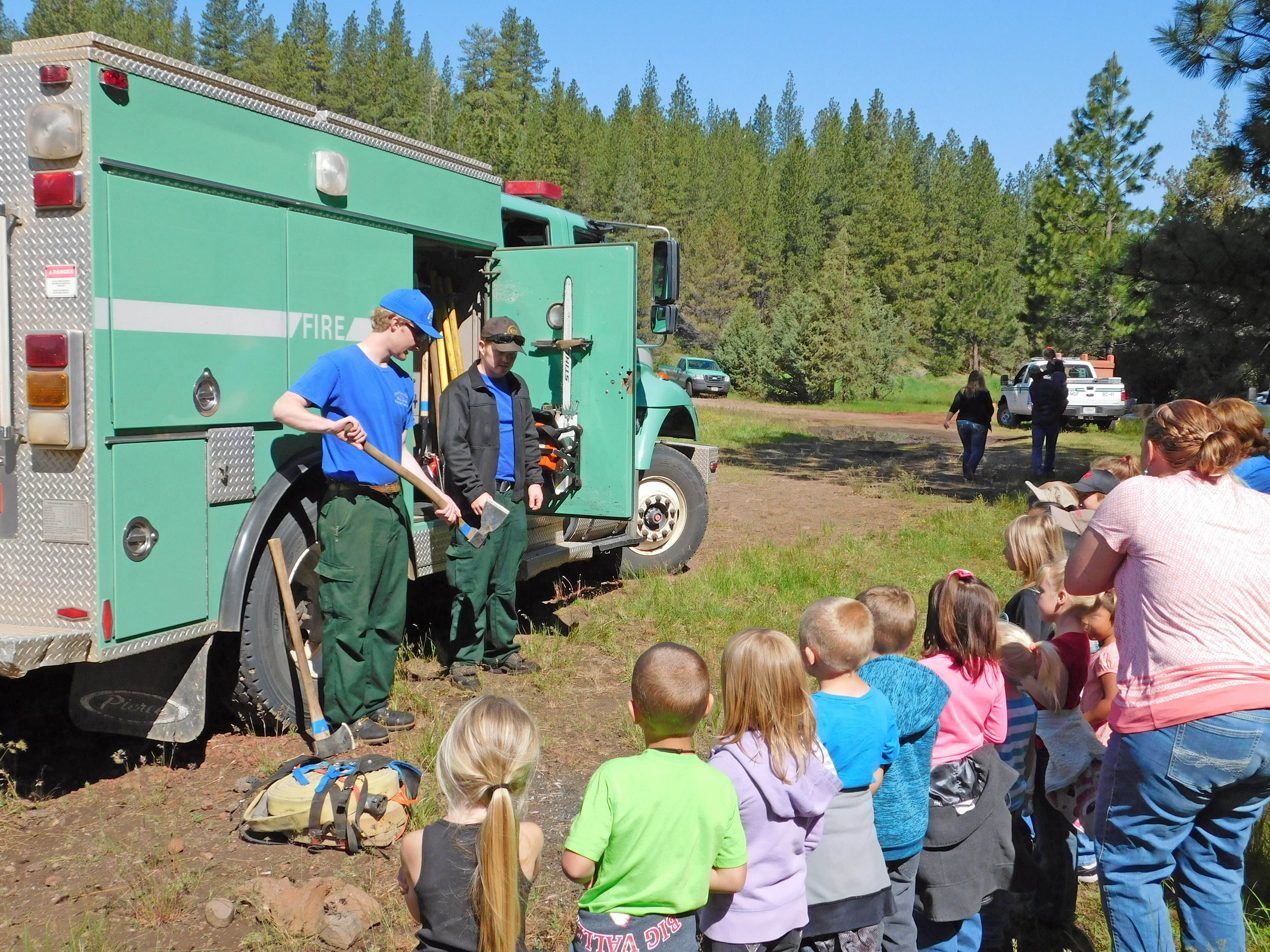
Members of the United States Forest Service Fire Department teaching children outdoor fire safety

Most U.S. fire departments have fire safety education programs.

Fire prevention programs may include distribution of smoke detectors, visiting schools to review key topics with the students and implementing nationally recognized programs such as NFPAS "Risk Watch" and "Learn not to burn".

Other programs or props can be purchased by fire departments or community organizations. These are usually entertaining and designed to capture children's attention and relay important messages. Props include those that are mostly auditory, such as puppets and robots. The prop is visually stimulating but the safety message is only transmitted orally. Other props are more elaborate, access more senses and increase the learning factor. They mix audio messages and visual cues with hands-on interaction. Examples of these include mobile trailer safety houses and tabletop hazard house simulators. Some fire prevention software is also being developed to identify hazards in a home.

All programs tend to mix messages of general injury prevention, safety, fire prevention, and escape in case of fire. In most cases the fire department representative is regarded as the expert and is expected to present information in a manner that is appropriate for each age group.

=== Fire educator qualifications ===
The US industry standard that outlines the recommended qualifications for fire safety educators is NFPA 1035: Standard for Professional Qualifications for Public Fire and Life Safety Educator, which includes the requirements for Fire and Life Safety Educator Levels I, II, and III; Public Information Officer; and Juvenile Firesetter Intervention Specialist Levels I and II.

=== Target audiences ===
According to the United States Fire Administration, the very young and the elderly are considered to be "at risk" populations. These groups represent approximately 33% of the population.

== Global perspectives ==
Fire safety has been highlighted in relation to global supply chain management. Sedex, the Supplier Ethical Data Exchange, a collaborative platform for sharing ethical supply chain data, and Verité, Inc., a Massachusetts-based supply chain investigatory NGO, issued a briefing in August 2013 which highlighted the significance of this issue. The briefing referred to several major factory fires, including the 2012 Dhaka garment factory fire in the Tazreen Fashion factory and other examples of fires in Bangladesh, Pakistan and elsewhere, compared the incidence of fire safety issues in a manufacturing context, and highlighted the need for buyers, suppliers and local fire safety enforcement agencies all to take action to improve fire safety within the supply chains for ready-made garments and other products. The briefing recommended that buyers seek greater visibility of fire safety and other risks across the supply chain and identify opportunities to improve standards: "buyers can encourage change through more responsible and consistent practices".

== Fire safety plan ==
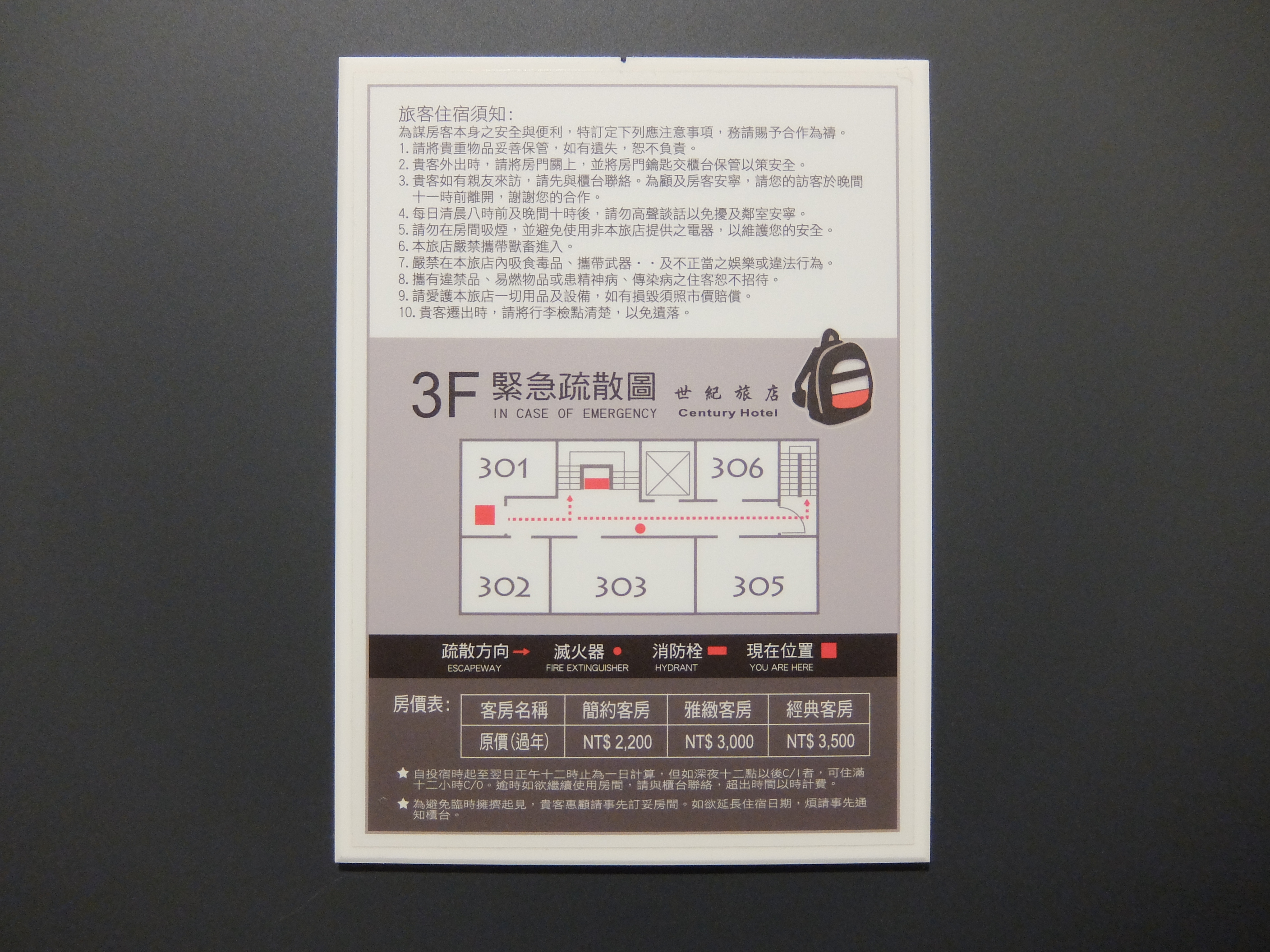
Fire escape plan of a hotel in Taiwan.

A fire safety plan is required by all North American national, state and provincial fire codes based on building use or occupancy types. Generally, the owner of the building is responsible for the preparation of a fire safety plan. Buildings with elaborate emergency systems may require the assistance of a fire protection consultant. After the plan has been prepared, it must be submitted to the Chief Fire Official or authority having jurisdiction for approval. Once approved, the owner is responsible for implementing the fire safety plan and training all staff in their duties. It is also the owner's responsibility to ensure that all visitors and staff are informed of what to do in case of fire. During a fire emergency, a copy of the approved fire safety plan must be available for the responding fire department's use.

In the United Kingdom, a fire safety plan is called a fire risk assessment.

=== Use of fire safety plans ===
Fire safety plans are a useful tool for fire fighters to have because they allow them to know critical information about a building that they may have to go into. Using this, fire fighters can locate and avoid potential dangers such as hazardous material (hazmat) storage areas and flammable chemicals. In addition to this, fire safety plans can also provide specialized information that, in the case of a hospital fire, can provide information about the location of things like the nuclear medicine ward. In addition to this, fire safety plans also greatly improve the safety of fire fighters. According to FEMA, 16 percent of all fire fighter deaths in 2002 occurred due to a structural collapse or because the fire fighter got lost. Fire safety plans can outline any possible structural hazards, as well as give the fire fighter knowledge of where he is in the building.

=== Fire safety plans in the fire code ===
In North America alone, there are around 8 million buildings that legally require a fire safety plan, be it due to provincial or state law. Not having a fire safety plan for buildings which fit the fire code occupancy type can result in a fine, and they are required for all buildings, such as commercial, industrial, assembly, etc.

=== Advances in fire safety planning ===
As previously stated, a copy of the approved fire safety plan shall be available for the responding fire department. This, however, is not always the case. Up until now, all fire plans were stored in paper form in the fire department. The problem with this is that sorting and storing these plans is a challenge, and it is difficult for people to update their fire plans. As a result, only half of the required buildings have fire plans, and of those, only around 10 percent are up-to-date. This problem has been solved through the introduction of digital fire plans. These fire plans are stored in a database and can be accessed wirelessly on site by firefighters and are much simpler for building owners to update.

== Insurance companies ==
Fire is one of the biggest threats to property with losses adding up to billions of dollars in damages every year. In 2019 alone, the total amount of property damage resulting from fire was $14.8 billion in the United States. Insurance companies in the United States are not only responsible for financially covering fire loss but are also responsible for managing risk associated with it. Most commercial insurance companies hire a risk control specialist whose primary job is to survey property to ensure compliance with NFPA standards, assess the current risk level of the property, and make recommendations to reduce the probability of fire loss. Careers in property risk management continue to grow and have been projected to grow 4 to 8% from 2018 to 2028 in the United States.

== See also ==
- Ablation – Removal of material from an object's surface
- Building information modeling – Process for digital management of built assets
- Emergency evacuation – Urgent removal of people from an area of imminent or ongoing threat
- Endothermic process – Thermodynamic process absorbing energy from its surroundings
- Fire drill – Method of practicing orderly evacuation in case of a fire
- Fire sprinkler – Component that discharges water to protect buildings
- Fire-adapted communities
- Firestop pillow
- Intumescent – Substance that swells as a result of heat exposure
- List of fires – List of notable fires
- Industrial fire – Disaster involving a conflagration in an industrial setting
- Listing and approval use and compliance – Document used for installations
- Product certification – Performance and quality assurance
- Safety Centre
