= Bucks County Show =

Annual Buckinghamshire agricultural show

Coordinates: 51°51′31.37″N 0°49′25.54″W

The Bucks County Show is an annual one-day agricultural show held in Buckinghamshire, England, established in 1859. In recent years it has been held in Weedon Park, two miles north of Aylesbury on the last Thursday of August. The show is organised by Bucks County Agricultural Association, a registered charity. The show includes qualifying events for the Horse of the Year Show and the Royal International Horse Show.

== History ==
The show was established in 1859 and was originally known as the Royal and Central Bucks Show following the amalgamation of the Royal Bucks Agricultural Association (obtaining its royal prefix in 1834) and the Central Bucks Agricultural Society. By 1891 it was called the Royal Bucks Show, and had 5,000 visitors and 670 entries. It is an annual, one-day show.

Since its inception, the show has been held in various locations including Waddesdon Manor, Walton Grange, Mentmore and Chesham. Between 1988 and 1952 the show was held in the grounds of Hartwell House. Since 1988 when it has remained at Weedon Park.

The show used to include ploughing matches held at Prebendal Farm, Aylesbury.

The 2014 show was the 147th event. There have been breaks in its history due to war and the foot and mouth outbreak in 2001.

== Events ==
The Show includes sixty cattle classes, more than thirty sheep classes, and around eighty horse classes, including showjumping, and qualifiers for the Horse of the Year Show and the Royal International Horse Show. There are trade stands, a home and garden marquee, and the 2024 show included a motorcycle FMX show.
