= Safety Centre =

Safety Centre (Hazard Alley) Ltd is a purpose-built interactive safety centre in Milton Keynes, opened in 1994. Primarily it provides safety education to visiting schools and youth groups via its full-size interactive demonstrations, known as Hazard Alley. It also provides a wider community service through adult courses in first aid and fire safety, as well as providing follow-up lessons to schools through its in-house teaching staff. It is a registered charity based in an industrial unit in Kiln Farm, Milton Keynes.

== Hazard Alley ==
Most of the unit's floorspace is occupied by Hazard Alley, a full-sized interactive "set" where several safety scenarios are simulated. It consists of two streets, a lake area and a farm (all inside), on which there are twelve scenarios in total. Each scenario is visited in turn by the groups, led by a volunteer guide. Groups spend ten minutes on each scenario, making the average session two hours long.

Groups typically contain six children, who are accompanied by one of the centre's guides. School age children are usually year three (age 7-8) and year six (age 10-11), but can vary anywhere between years two and seven. A session is called a "tour", throughout which there will be three opportunities for each member of the group (in pairs) to attempt a simulated 999 call. This is designed to build their confidence should a real emergency ever present itself. The scenarios are as follows:

Number 2, Brooks Street - A fire simulation. Children discuss the importance of smoke alarms, and what to do in case of fire. Two children attempt a 999 call.

Number 4, Brooks Street - A demonstration of dangers within the home, particularly dangers posed to young children such as lit cigarettes and alcohol. Contains a living room area and a kitchen area.

Number 8, Brooks Street - A "cinema". Schools are given the option of two interactive videos: a film portraying the consequences of vandalism, or an interactive quiz about internet safety, particularly in chat rooms.

Building site - Children are invited to identify ten significant dangers found on building sites, as well as discussing measures that can be put in place to reduce danger. A "burning car" demonstration reiterates the fire safety message, and two children make a 999 call.

Road safety - Children are shown a demonstration of stopping distances, and attempt to cross the "road" using a full-size pelican crossing. The importance of high-visibility clothing and bicycle helmets is demonstrated.

Railway - A full-scale train simulation indicates the dangers of trespassing on railway lines. There is also an in-depth discussion of the dangers of high voltage cables and electrified tracks.

Garage - Children cross from the railway to a filling station forecourt using a zebra crossing, discussing hazards posed by large HGVs. On the forecourt the group explores safe storage of petrol, use of high pressure air lines, airbags, booster seats, seat belts and the dangers of smoking or using mobile phones in a petrol station. Key messages are summarised by a short interactive quiz which uses handsets to allow children to answer the questions.

Dark alley - The group investigates an alleyway and its dangers, such as litter, abandoned syringes, and strangers. "Early warning signs", physical reactions to fear such as jumping or sweating, are also physically demonstrated.

Water - Groups visit a lake (loosely modelled on nearby Willen Lake), encountering a person who has fallen into the water - prompting the remaining pair to make a 999 call. In the winter groups discuss the dangers of icy lakes, as well as pointing out various dangers such as depth and pollution. Attention is also drawn to the dangers of fishing lines near high-voltage overhead cables, as well as a discussion of the hazards posed by lock gates.

First aid - An interactive video allows pairs to attempt the recovery position.

Farm - Dangers such as hazardous chemicals (including unlabelled containers), working animals and heavy machinery are discussed. Demonstrations include a combine harvester and a silo.

Shop - Children explore their own personal responsibility in matters such as shoplifting. Various methods of theft prevention are demonstrated, and groups discuss various sources of advice in the event of peer pressure or bullying.

The Safety Centre's aim is to demonstrate hazards in a highly interactive way using active, hands-on experience as a more effective learning method than classroom teaching. Its policy is to illustrate dangerous situations and ways in which they can be prevented, actively avoiding explaining ways of physically combating dangers, such as extinguishing fires - the knowledge of which might prompt a child to put himself in danger by deciding to fight a fire himself rather than evacuating the area and leaving a responsible adult to combat the problem. Its key message is to put the child's own personal safety as the highest priority.

== Impact and effectiveness ==
The Safety Centre has a high profile across Milton Keynes and the wider area. Because of its specialised purpose, there are very few similar centres in the country, thus it has a very wide catchment area including Buckinghamshire, Northamptonshire, Oxfordshire, Bedfordshire, Hertfordshire and north London. Many schools visit annually. The name "Hazard Alley" is recognised amongst children and students who remember their visits; fan groups on applications such as Facebook have sprung up, and many young people return as volunteer guides.

Because its primary purpose is to prevent dangers and injuries, it is impossible to measure the true extent of the Safety Centre's effectiveness. However, there are several examples in the local press of children avoiding accidents using knowledge they had learned at Hazard Alley.
