= High Wycombe Roman villa =

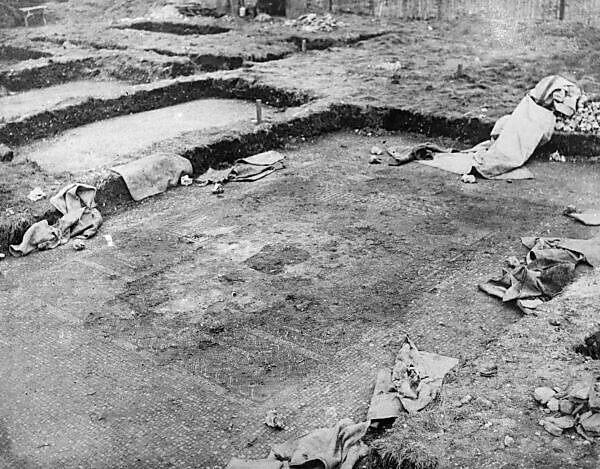
- The mosaic that once adorned the floor of Room I of the villa in 1933
- Interactive map of the High Wycombe Roman villa area

General information
- Location: High Wycombe grid reference SU87409239, United Kingdom
- Coordinates: 51°37′24.79″N 0°44′19.89″W
- Construction started: 150
- Completed: 170
- Demolished: no earlier than 324 (original building); 1855–56 (ruins)

High Wycombe Roman villa is a Roman villa and bath house complex located in High Wycombe, England.

== History ==
The villa and bath house complex at High Wycombe was constructed between 150 and 170 and was expanded during the early 4th century; it was inhabited until at least the 4th century, with the latest dateable object discovered at the site being a coin which dates from 320 to 324. Despite this, no evidence of the building's destruction was identified.

Some of the roof tiles were re-used in the construction of the Hospital of St John the Baptist between the 1170s and 1180, and much of the ruins of the villa and bath house complex were destroyed between 1855 and 1856 when a modern bath house was constructed on the site.

The Battle of Wycombe Rye is also believed to have been fought on the site of High Wycombe Roman villa during the First English Civil War in 1642.

== Excavation ==
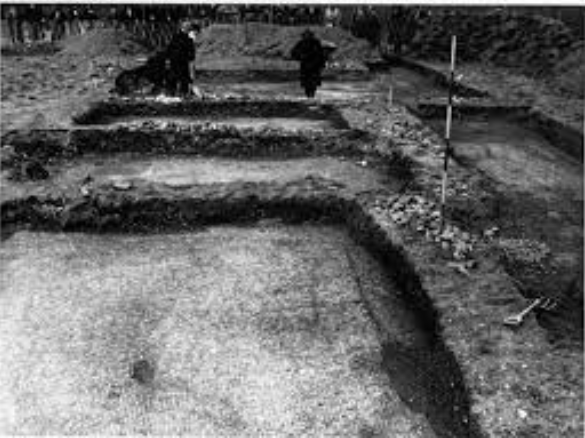
The villa being excavated during 1932

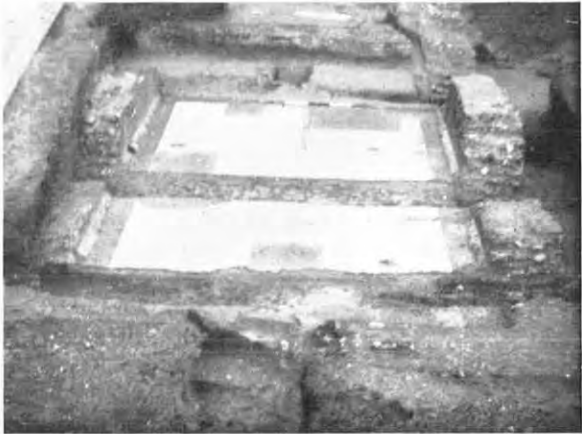
Room VIII of the bath house being excavated during 1954

Robbers previously removed parts of the floor tiles of the bath house prior to its discovery, and the first of two mosaics was discovered on 1 July 1724 which was initially believed to be Roman pavement. It was excavated by Edward John Payne in 1862 and in the same excavation, Payne discovered fragments of a second mosaic and the isolated tesserae of a third (both believed to have been constructed alongside the villa in the 2nd century) alongside broken fragments of wall plaster.

On 25 April 1932, Francis Colmer excavated the site and located the site where E. J. Payne excavated, and the second mosaic (located in Room I) was also re-discovered, when it was sketched and re-buried in 1933. The site of the complex was then granted to allotments, and as a result of this, the Room I mosaic was slowly destroyed by gardeners who were unaware of its existence; whatever remained was destroyed during building work on the site during the early 1950s.

The site was extensively excavated during 1954–55 and the layout of the villa was established, along with the discovery of the bath house, which was also extensively excavated.

The villa was last excavated in 2002, when in situ wall plaster was discovered at the site and the remaining part of the mosaic was preserved.
