= Terry Long (footballer) =

English footballer and manager (1934–2021)

Personal information
- Full name: Terence Anthony Long
- Date of birth: 17 November 1934
- Place of birth: Tylers Green, England
- Date of death: 19 September 2021 (aged 86)
- Position: Defender

Youth career
- Arsenal

Senior career*
Years	Team	Apps	(Gls)
- Wycombe Wanderers
1955–1970	Crystal Palace	442	(16)

Managerial career
- 1980: Millwall (caretaker)
- * Club domestic league appearances and goals

Terence Anthony Long (17 November 1934 – 19 September 2021) was an English professional football player and coach, who played for Crystal Palace as a defender between 1955 and 1970 making a then record number of appearances for his only League club.

== Early and personal life ==
Long was born in Tylers Green, Buckinghamshire on 17 November 1934. He attended the Royal Grammar School High Wycombe from 1946 to 1951.

== Playing career ==
Long, who played as a defender, began his playing career as an amateur with Arsenal, before signing for his local team Wycombe Wanderers at that time a non-league club competing in the Isthmian League. In May 1955, he signed for Crystal Palace, and went on to make over 400 appearances in the Football League before retiring as a player in 1970.

During Long's playing career, he appeared for Palace initially in the old Third Division South and then in the fourth, third and second tiers of the League after reorganisation in 1958. In doing so, he put together a sequence of 214 consecutive appearances and was a part of the 1961 and 1964 promotion sides. However, he made only two appearances in the 1968–69 season which saw Palace reach the top flight for the first time but although he remained a player until the 1970 close season, did not make an appearance in the old First Division during the 1969–70 season. He thus played for Crystal Palace in four different divisions of the League, but not in the top flight.

== Coaching career ==
After retirement, Long remained at Palace as a coach, and in 1972, was appointed assistant manager to Bert Head. However, when Head was replaced by Malcolm Allison in 1973, Long also left Crystal Palace.

He later had a spell as caretaker manager of Millwall, reverting to assistant manager until he was sacked during the 1982–83 season.

== Later life and death ==
He died on 19 September 2021, aged 86.
