= Micklefield (disambiguation) =

Micklefield may refer to:

- Micklefield in West Yorkshire, England
- Micklefield, High Wycombe, an area of High Wycombe in Buckinghamshire, England
- Micklefield Green in Hertfordshire, England
