= Chepping Wycombe =

Civil parish in Buckinghamshire, England

Coordinates: 51.6081°N 0.6972°W

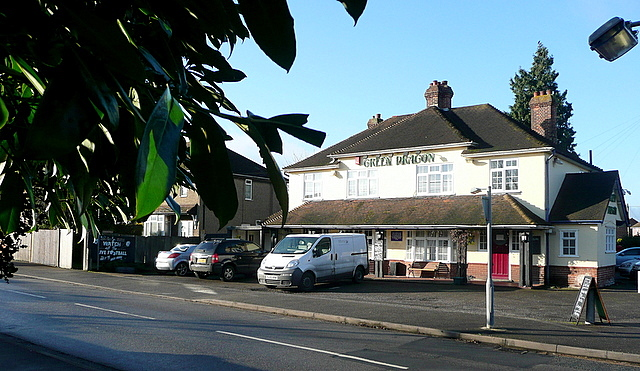
- Green Dragon, Flackwell Heath, 2010

- Location within Buckinghamshire
- Population: 14,455; 14,648 (2011 Census)
- OS grid reference: SU905908
- Civil parish: Chepping Wycombe
- Unitary authority: Buckinghamshire
- Ceremonial county: Buckinghamshire
- Region: South East
- Country: England
- Sovereign state: United Kingdom
- Post town: High Wycombe
- Postcode district: HP10
- Dialling code: 01494
- Police: Thames Valley
- Fire: Buckinghamshire
- Ambulance: South Central
- UK Parliament: Wycombe

Chepping Wycombe is a civil parish in the ceremonial county of Buckinghamshire, England. The parish includes the three large villages of Tylers Green, Loudwater, and Flackwell Heath. The central part of the parish comprises extensive business and industrial development lying adjacent and underneath an elevated section of the M40 in the valley of the River Wye.

The name is a variant of earlier Chipping, from the Old English word cieping, 'market' or 'market-place'. Historically, Chepping or Chipping Wycombe was the formal name of the ancient borough and later municipal borough of High Wycombe or Much-Wiccomb. It was also the name of the ancient parish which included the borough and extended further than the borough boundary to also cover the surrounding rural area.

The ancient parish of Chepping Wycombe was split in 1866, with the part inside the borough becoming a separate civil parish called "Wycombe" or "Wycombe Borough", leaving the reduced parish of Chepping Wycombe covering the more rural areas outside the borough. Between 1868 and 1880 the parish of Chepping Wycombe was governed by a Local Board of Health. The board was abolished in 1880 when the borough boundaries were extended, notably taking in Wycombe Marsh and other areas from Chepping Wycombe parish. However, the parish boundaries were not changed to match the new borough boundary in 1880, and so the parish of Chepping Wycombe again found itself part inside and part outside the borough. In 1894, when parish councils were introduced under the Local Government Act 1894, the civil parish of Chepping Wycombe was split between the urban area of High Wycombe (Chepping Wycombe Urban parish) and the rural areas outside the borough to the east (Chepping Wycombe Rural parish). The parish was reduced in size in 1901 ceding land to the adjacent High Wycombe parish and its boundaries were further changed in 1934. Chepping Wycombe Rural parish was renamed simply Chepping Wycombe in 1949.

Today the areas which comprised the historic borough and that of the civil parish, (the residual part of the ecclesiastical parish) together with West Wycombe constitute the majority of the present-day High Wycombe Urban Area.
