= Micklefield, High Wycombe =

Area of High Wycombe, Buckinghamshire, England

Coordinates: 51.62998°N 0.71506°W

Micklefield is a ward of High Wycombe, Buckinghamshire, located on the eastern side of the town. Surrounded on one side by the Chiltern Hills and King's Wood, it neighbours the villages of Penn and Tylers Green, as well as being adjacent to Wycombe Marsh. Some points in the Micklefield area rise to an altitude of some 450 feet, and there are views over the Wycombe valley.

Amenities include a Jet petrol station with an attached supermarket, a combined first and middle school (Ash Hill Primary School), and three churches – St Peter's (Church of England), Micklefield Christian Fellowship (Elim Pentecostal Church) and a Seventh-day Adventist church – and a shopping area next to a community library. The library was earmarked for closure by Bucks County Council, but was saved by a local campaign to keep it running. It has been awarded National Lottery grants to rebuild a larger library.

In 2006, Micklefield was the subject of international media interest when key aspects of the investigation into the 2006 transatlantic aircraft plot focused on local homes and a five-month-long search of King's Wood was conducted by police.
