= Highcrest Academy =

The Highcrest Academy
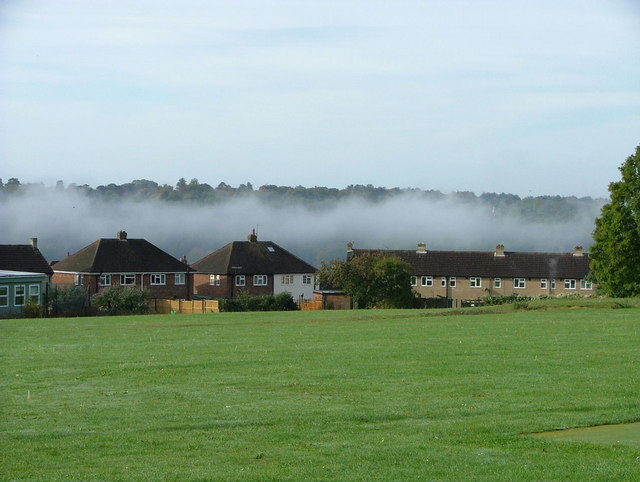
- Morning mist in the Wycombe valley from The Highcrest Academy playing fields

Location
- Hatters Lane; High Wycombe, Buckinghamshire, HP13 7NQ; England
- 51.62943°N 0.72441°W

Information
- Type: Academy
- Established: 2001
- Department for Education URN: 136858 Tables
- Ofsted: Reports
- Principal: G Burke (previously Shena Moynihan)
- Staff: 130
- Gender: Coeducational
- Age: 11 to 18
- Enrolment: 1067
- Colours: Red & Black & White
- Website: www.highcrestacademy.org.uk

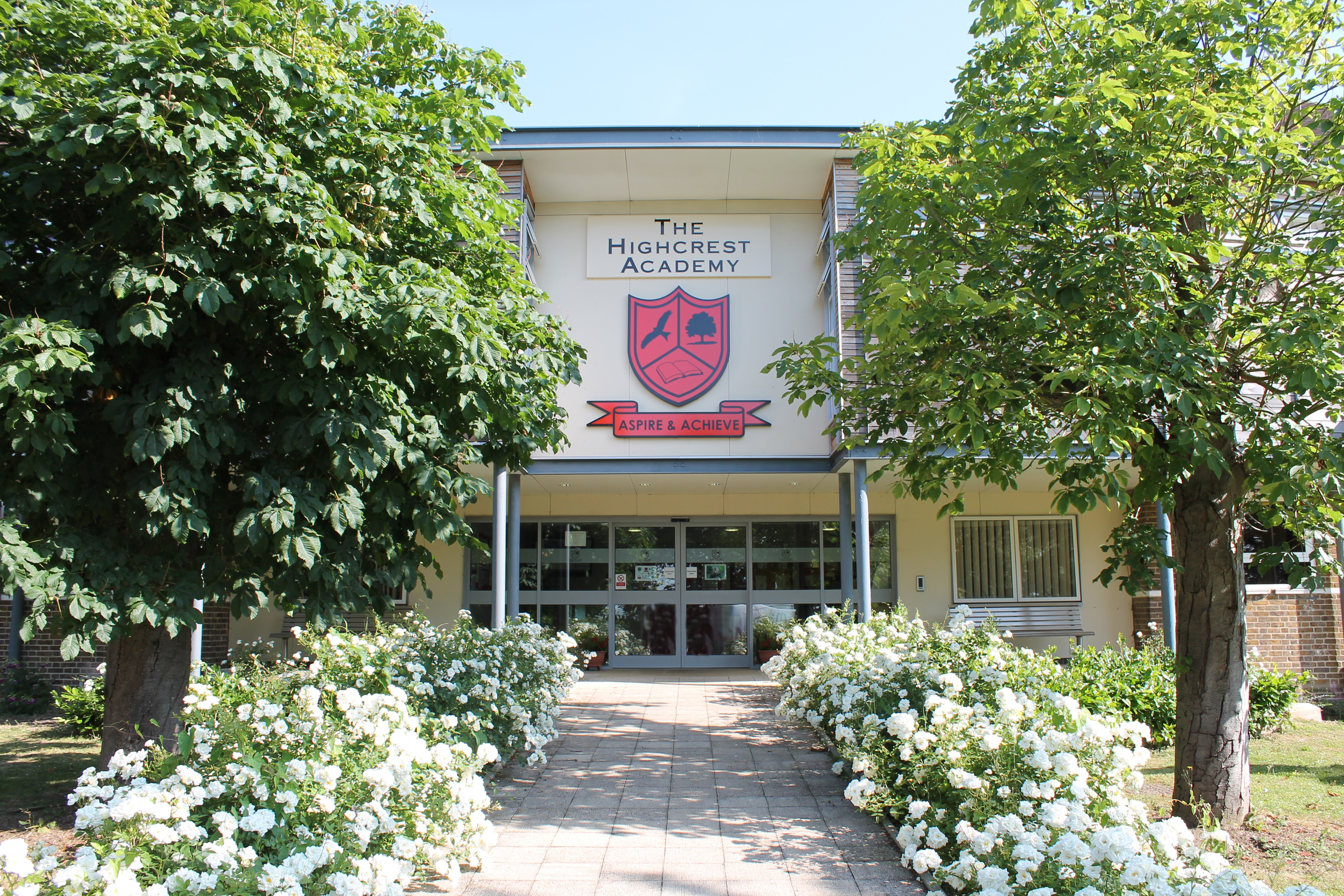

The Highcrest Academy, formerly known as Highcrest Community School and before that as Hatters Lane School, is situated on Hatters Lane Hill in High Wycombe, Buckinghamshire. The headteacher is Mr G Burke; the previous headteacher was Shena Moynihan. In November 2010 it was judged to be an 'outstanding' school by Ofsted. In July 2011 the school became an Academy and was renamed to reflect its new status.

It is a mixed secondary school, which takes children from the age of 11 through to the age of 18. As of October 2024, there are 1,068 pupils at The Highcrest Academy: 180 in each of years 7, 8, 9, 10 and 11; with 160 in the Sixth Form. The school has 67 teachers and 63 support staff.

In September 2006 the school was designated by the Department for Education and Skills (DfES) as a specialist school in Technology.

The Highcrest Academy is one of several Buckinghamshire schools it is one which hosts mobile phone masts. Contracts between Buckinghamshire Council and various mobile phone operators generate an income of £145,000 per annum, of which about £59,000 comes from contracts for masts that are installed in schools.
