= High Wycombe Guildhall =

Municipal building in High Wycombe, Buckinghamshire, England

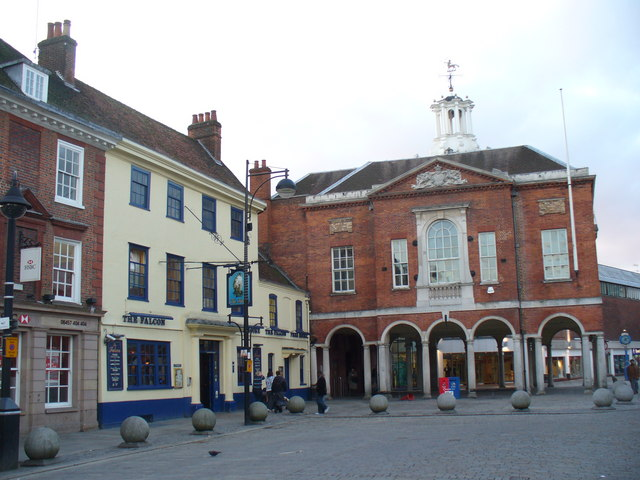
- High Wycombe Guildhall in 2009

- Location within Buckinghamshire
- 51°37′46″N 0°45′05″W
- Location: High Wycombe, Buckinghamshire

History
- Built: 1757

Site notes
- Architect: Henry Keene
- Architectural style: Neo-classical style

Listed Building – Grade I
- Designated: 9 January 1954
- Reference no.: 1332349

The High Wycombe Guildhall is a public building located on the High Street of High Wycombe in Buckinghamshire, England. It is a Grade I listed building. It was designed by Henry Keene and completed in 1757.

== History ==
A medieval guildhall once stood in the High Street and was retained until at least the mid 17th century after a more modern structure was built in a slightly different location in 1604.

After the 17th century guildhall was burnt down in a fire in the mid-18th century, a new guildhall, which was designed by Henry Keene in the neo-classical style, was built at the expense of the Earl of Shelburne, a local member of parliament, in 1757.

The external design involved five bays with arcading on the ground floor; windows were inserted in each of the bays on the east, west and north elevations on the first floor. At roof level, the builder erected an octagonal cupola with Doric order columns and a wrought iron weather vane above. The building was renovated at the expense of Sir George Henry Dashwood, a local member of parliament, in 1859 and a stone plaque was subsequently erected at first floor level in the middle of the north elevation to commemorate his contribution. Internally, the principal room on the first floor was the council chamber with capacity to seat 100 people and a smaller room, now known as the Shelburne Room.

In 1830, during a debate on the Swing Riots, a scene of public disorder broke out when the councillors started fighting with each other. The council was incorporated under the Municipal Corporations Act 1835, and council meetings of the municipal borough of High Wycombe were still held in the guildhall into the late 1920s and it was not until the early 1930s that council meetings moved to the council chamber in the municipal offices in Queen Victoria Road.

A portrait of the Prince of Wales was presented by to the town by the local land owner, Lord Carrington, in 1876; it was subsequently hung on the wall of the council chamber, which is now known as the Carrington Room.

The guildhall continues to be the scene of the annual weighing-in ceremony at which the elected mayor is weighed to ensure they have not been indulging excessively at the rate payers' expense.

== See also ==
- Guild
- Guildhall
