= St Michael's Catholic School, High Wycombe =

St Michael's Catholic School

Location
- Daws Hill Lane; High Wycombe, Buckinghamshire, HP11 1PW; England; 51°37′06″N 0°45′21″W

Information
- Type: Academy
- Religious affiliation: Roman Catholic
- Established: 1973
- Local authority: Buckinghamshire
- Trust: St Thomas Catholic Academies Trust
- Department for Education URN: 149612 Tables
- Ofsted: Reports
- Executive Headteacher: Louise Baker
- Gender: Coeducational
- Age: 3 to 19
- Enrolment: 1930
- Houses: Matthew; Mark; Luke; John; Paul
- Colours: Sky blue Black
- Diocese: Northampton
- Dedication: Saint Michael
- Website: www.stmichaels.bucks.sch.uk

St Michael's Catholic School is a Catholic all-through school located in High Wycombe, Buckinghamshire, England. In 2023 the school had 1930 pupils. It enrols children aged 3 through 19.

The school's catchment area for many years has included Aylesbury and surrounding areas, which has a high proportion of baptised Catholics.

== History ==
The school was founded in 1973 as St Bernard's Catholic School as a satellite of St Bernard's Catholic Grammar School in Slough.

According to the BBC's Domesday Project, in 1986 the school had 840 pupils between the ages of 11 and 16. The buildings were reported to have been 10 years old at the time, in front of extensive playing fields on a site of 17 acres.

In September 2008, St Bernard's Catholic School was awarded specialist school status as a Science College, by the Department for Children, Schools and Families (DCSF).

In 2011, the school amalgamated with neighbouring Catholic primary school St Augustine's Catholic Primary, creating an all-through school called St Augustine's and St Bernard's Catholic School. In the same year, the school was among 494 schools nationwide praised by the Specialist Schools and Academies Trust for its fast improvement of GCSE results. The number of pupils receiving five A* – C grades, including in English and Maths, increased from 42 per cent in 2009 to 64 per cent in 2011.

From September 2012, the school stopped being called St Augustine's and St Bernard's Catholic School and is now known by its current name.

In February 2017, it was announced that the school was proposing the creation of a satellite school at the Aylesbury Vale Academy's former site due to lack of space and population increase predictions. At the time the proposals were made, the school was expected to open in September 2018 with a Year 7 intake of 120 students. In September 2019, the new buildings were opened, with students relocating to the facility.

Previously a voluntary aided school administered by Buckinghamshire County Council, in April 2023 St Michael's Catholic School converted to academy status. The school is now sponsored by the St Thomas Catholic Academies Trust, but continues to be under the jurisdiction of the Roman Catholic Diocese of Northampton.
