= Wycombe Summit =

Dry ski slope in High Wycombe, Buckinghamshire

Coordinates: 51.6136°N 0.7306°W

The Wycombe Summit was a dry ski slope situated in High Wycombe, Buckinghamshire. It has been closed since 22 November 2005, when a fire destroyed the lodge. In November 2016, Wycombe District Council approved a planning application for 30 dwellings on the site. The plans will also bring the neighbouring Deangarden Wood into positive management and enable formal public use to the Woods.

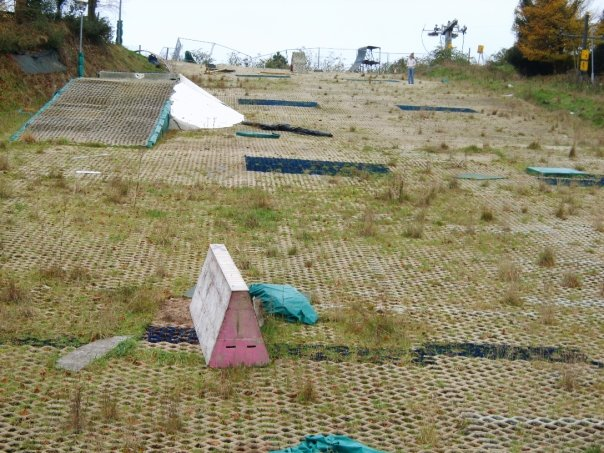
The remains of the Summit in 2008

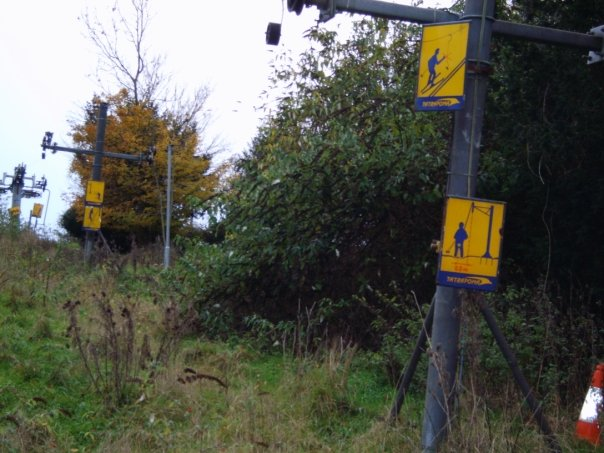
The Derelict Ski Lift

== Dry Ski Slope Centre ==
The ski slope opened in 1994 and was situated in Abbey Barn Lane, just south of High Wycombe. The main slope was one of England's longest dry ski slopes, at 300m long. Though with two longer slopes, at 350m and 320m long, Sheffield has two longer slopes. Facilities on the site included a ski equipment shop, restaurant and bar.

In 1998 a 13-year-old was killed at the ski centre after a 'catalogue of errors by Wycombe Summit Ltd' led to a foreseeable accident. A prosecution by the HSE led to fines of £13,500 and payment of costs of £10,000. Crucially, local people lost confidence in the ability of the Ski Centre to take care of the safety of skiers.

The summit was liable for £2 million of debt from its construction costs, and in 2003 was briefly closed down and placed into receivership. However it reopened later that year under the management of SnowDome Group Ltd, who also own and operate the Tamworth SnowDome. The Wycombe Summit then continued trading until 2006.

In August 2004, SnowDome Group revealed they were in talks with Wycombe District Council to replace the dry ski slope with one using artificial snow.

== Fire and closure ==
On the morning of 22 November 2005, a massive fire ripped through the Summit lodge. The fire started in the kitchen, and at its height was fought by more than 50 firefighters, leaving only one wall of the lodge standing.

Following the fire, the slope's operators announced they no longer considered it viable to repair the dry ski slope, and the previously announced plans to build an artificial snow slope were brought forward.

== Indoor ski slope ==
SnowDome Group submitted plans to construct an indoor ski slope to Wycombe District Council, who approved the plans on 5 December 2007. The plans included a 100m artificial snow slope, an academy slope, a leisure ice rink, a children's snow play area and a Starbucks Coffee outlet. SnowDome Group Ltd said that the old dry ski slope would be retained, making the new Wycombe SnowDome the only site in the UK to have artificial snow and dry slopes on the same site.

Construction was supposed to start in September 2008, with an opening date of September 2009. However, on 20 May 2009, SnowDome Group announced that legal problems had been encountered with the planning permission, and as such construction would be delayed. The slope and surrounding area have become more increasingly dilapidated. From a recent survey of the existing site, all debris of the burnt lodge have been removed, the chair-lifts appear to have been partially dismantled, and the dry slope, grounds and car park are overgrown and in a very poor state of repair.

On 16 March 2010, the future of the SnowDome project became more hopeful after a public informal planning enquiry was conducted at Wycombe District Council offices. SnowDome submitted revised proposals, and a Section 106 agreement was signed off by the developers, Wycombe District Council and Buckinghamshire County Council. The revised development still has to be approved by the Planning Inspectorate and conform with planning conditions - the outcome of which was expected within a month. As of January 2012, Snowdome Ltd. appears to have abandoned its plans to re-develop the site as an indoor & outdoor ski slope and has put the land up for sale.

== Housing development and woodland management ==
In mid-2015, local development company Hambledon Land took control of the site which, by this point, had been derelict for over ten years. Following local engagement, Hambledon Land submitted a planning application in April 2016.

Planning consent was subsequently granted by Wycombe District Council on 29 November 2016. The proposals for the site include 30 new high-quality homes, on-site affordable housing and will fund a comprehensive woodland management plan to bring the adjacent Deangarden Wood into positive management. A number of contributions towards local infrastructure were also secured by the proposals.
