= Flackwell Heath =

Village in Buckinghamshire, England

Coordinates: 51.60087°N 0.71205°W

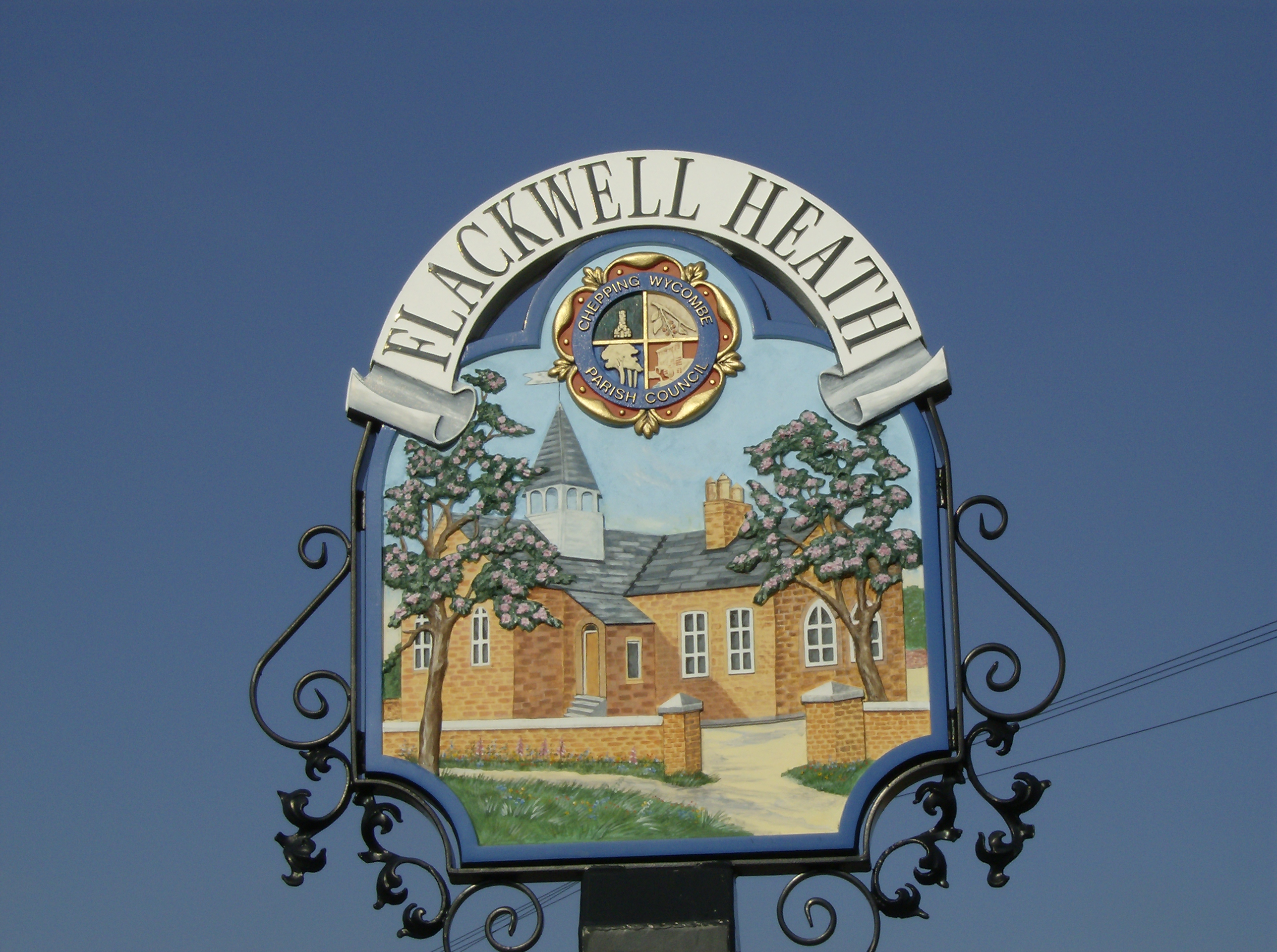
- Flackwell Heath sign depicting the old village school

- Location within Buckinghamshire
- Population: 5,900
- OS grid reference: SU893899
- Civil parish: Chepping Wycombe
- Unitary authority: Buckinghamshire
- Ceremonial county: Buckinghamshire
- Region: South East
- Country: England
- Sovereign state: United Kingdom
- Post town: HIGH WYCOMBE
- Postcode district: HP10
- Dialling code: 01628
- Police: Thames Valley
- Fire: Buckinghamshire
- Ambulance: South Central
- UK Parliament: Beaconsfield

Flackwell Heath is a village in the civil parish of Chepping Wycombe on the outskirts of High Wycombe, Buckinghamshire, England. With an elevation of about 150 metres (490 ft), in the Chiltern Hills. It has a population of around 6000.

== History ==
The name 'Flackwell' is of dubious origin but may describe the source of a stream which once started in this area. The heath was once covered with cherry orchards, "a place of annual resort and festivity during the cherry season" with many cherry pickers traveling from London for the annual event.

This is now commemorated in the name of a pub, the Carrington school emblem and in road names such as Cherrywood Gardens. The area covered by Flackwell Heath was once four villages; Flackwell Heath, North-End Woods, Heath End, and Sedgemoor. However, housing developments, particularly post-1945, meant the four eventually formed one large village: Flackwell Heath.

The original villagers were in the main farm workers, but some bargemen and mill workers also lived in the village. In the late 19th century, industrial mill workers became more commonplace in the village, and the first furniture makers and workers began to settle too, with Flackwell Heath's close proximity to High Wycombe – well known for the chair and furniture industry.

== Amenities ==
The village has several shops with Sainsbury's (Local) being the largest of these. There are two Indian takeaways and a fish and chip shop as well as convenience stores and other shops.

Although Flackwell Heath previously had six public houses in the village, the site of The Magpie has been redeveloped and The Green Man (1755 to 2011) demolished, with a Sainsbury's Local store built on the site in the centre of the village. The remaining four pubs are; The Cherry Tree (found on Straight Bit in the heart of the village), The Green Dragon (located in the south of the village, on the corner between Blind Lane and Green Dragon Road), The Three Horseshoes on Common Road (close to the Golf Club) and The Stag (at the Western end of the village on Heath End Road).

Other features of the village include a water tower, war memorial and recreation ground. There is only one listed building, a former farmhouse dating from the 17th – early 18th century.

=== Sport and leisure ===
A golf course Flackwell Heath Golf Club dating from 1904 is located on the village outskirts. In the 90s the golf club kitchen was run by Frank Wood. He cooked roast dinners and catered for hundreds of Members during his time at the golf club.

There is also Flackwell Heath Football Club, a Non-League football team who play at Wilkes Park in the west of the village.

== Community ==
There is a Methodist Church and the recently extended Christ Church, which includes stained glass designed by Patrick Reyntiens. A community centre is situated in the village centre, and has notably been made use of for the Scout's 2006 Christmas Pantomime, "Treasure Island", the 2007 pantomime, "Robin Hood", "Cinderella" in 2008 and most recently, "Dick Whittington" in 2009. The Scout Pantomimes were "enjoyed by all". The Community Centre is also home to an 'indoor boot sale' has been held every Sunday during Winter for the past few years, attracting many to the village. It is also used as a polling station for general elections.

There is an annual firework display on the weekend nearest 5 November in the Carrington School Playing field, next to the 1st Flackwell Heath Scout's HQ (it was previously held on the recreation ground), which features two firework displays and several foods and drink stores. The firework display has been hugely successful for 30 years. A village Fête held every year on the recreation ground was revived as the 'Cherry Fayre'. Every year, this celebration has had a different theme – one such theme being Chitty Chitty Bang Bang. In celebration of the Queen's Diamond Jubilee in June 2012, a number of village organisations (including the Residents' Association, Community Association, Scout Group, WI and Royal British Legion) ran a series of events across the Bank Holiday Weekend.

Every Remembrance Sunday, there is a parade around the village war memorial, hosted by the Royal British Legion and attended by service men and women past and present, 1st Flackwell Heath Scout Group, Flackwell Heath Guide District, Flackwell Heath Girl's Brigade and more recently a local Troop of the Boy Scouts of America. Every year the parade sees hundreds of residents stood around the memorial and many wreaths laid.

The Flackwell Heath Residents' Association and the Flackwell Heath Community Association both host numerous events throughout the year for the residents, including Race Nights, Quiz Nights, Music Events and Dances. The Grapevine newsletter is distributed to the village community ten times a year and is put together and run by volunteers.

There is a large wood (Fennels Wood), which runs alongside a large part of Flackwell Heath and consists mainly of Beech trees. It also has an area where people ride their bicycles, this is locally known as 'The Dells'. The wood hit the news in September 2006, as it was briefly closed off, due to a suspicious find relating to the transatlantic aircraft terrorist plot.

House prices are relatively high in Flackwell Heath due to its closeness both to London and pleasant rural areas.

== Education ==
There are three primary schools in the village, Juniper Hill, Carrington Junior School, and Carrington Infant School. The catchment areas for the schools are the east and west sides of the village respectively. Flackwell Heath is also home to the Wycombe campus of Amersham & Wycombe College. The college is based in Spring Lane on the site of a former secondary school that was built in the late 1960s and closed in 1985. The village is also in the catchment area of Grammar Schools, including John Hampden Grammar School for boys and Wycombe High School for girls, which are both situated 3 miles from the centre of the village in High Wycombe.

== Transport ==
The M40 from junction 3 to 4 runs through the middle of Fennels Wood. Junction 3 of the M40 can be found a short distance away from Flackwell Heath in Loudwater.

Flackwell Heath was once served by the High Wycombe to Maidenhead railway line, via Loudwater railway station at the bottom of Treadaway Hill. The line and station were closed in 1970 although you can walk along the disused railway line through Fennels Wood.

Carousel operate the council contracted bus service 36 from Flackwell Heath to High Wycombe and Bourne End, Buckinghamshire. There are also a number of school buses that operate from Flackwell Heath and in the mornings and afternoons.

== Famous residents (past and present) ==
- Nicola Blackwood – MP for Oxford West and Abingdon from 2010 to 2017
- Kevin Keen – footballer
- Matt Sealy – paralympian
- Lauren Torley – rugby union player
- Ed Welch – singer-songwriter and composer
- Kevin Buzzard – mathematician
- David Gyasi - actor
