= Wycombe Museum =

Local museum in Buckinghamshire, England

Coordinates: 51.6313°N 0.7481°W

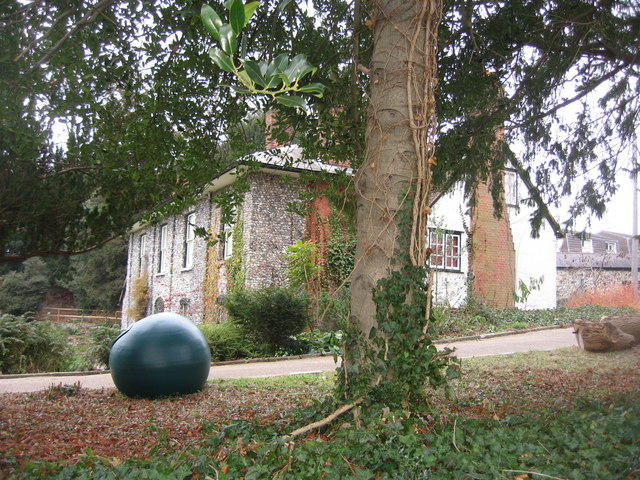
View of Wycombe Museum

Wycombe Museum is a free local museum located in the town of High Wycombe, Buckinghamshire, England. It is run by Wycombe Heritage and Arts Trust, as of 1 December 2016. It was previously run by Wycombe District Council.

== Background ==
The museum is located in Castle Hill House, a Grade II listed building on Priory Avenue. The house was built in the late sixteenth or early seventeenth century and remodelled in around 1778, and surrounding the museum are Victorian gardens.

== Collections ==
The museum presents exhibitions the history of the local area, including the furniture industry, especially chair-making. There are displays of Windsor chairs, lace, art and natural history.

They also hold a collection of other furniture and tools that relate to the furniture industry in and around High Wycombe, including videotapes of craftsmen at work. In addition to this they hold an extensive art collection, including oil paintings, prints, watercolours, drawings, engravings, brass rubbings and sculpture, as well as a collection of tokens and coins — including trade tokens relating to the Wycombe and Buckinghamshire areas.

The museum also houses an archive, which includes sale catalogues, price lists, design books and account books of furniture companies dating back to the 19th century. In addition to this, the archive contains photographs relating to the town and the furniture industry and trade in the Wycombe area.

There were previously displays relating to Wycombe Wanderers, with a section showcasing memorabilia from the football club, including the Wycombe Comanche mascot, however this sadly closed.

== In popular culture ==
The museum was mentioned in Gavin & Stacey, written by James Corden who was raised in the area.

== See also ==
- Wycombe Repertory Theatre
- High Wycombe Chair Making Museum
