= Cressex Community School =

Location
- Holmers Lane; High Wycombe, Buckinghamshire, HP12 4QA; England
- Coordinates: 51°36′49″N 0°47′00″W

Information
- Type: Foundation school
- Local authority: Buckinghamshire
- Trust: Cressex Co-operative Learning Partnership
- Department for Education URN: 110500 Tables
- Ofsted: Reports
- Headteacher: Khaiam Shabbir
- Deputy Headteacher: Mohammed Akhtar
- Gender: Coeducational
- Age: 11 to 16
- Enrolment: 754
- Houses: Everest, Nevis, Snowdon, Olympus and K2
- Colours: Blue and black
- Website: http://www.cressex.bucks.sch.uk

Cressex Community School is a cooperative trust secondary school in High Wycombe, Buckinghamshire. It is a foundation school, which takes children from the age of 11 through to the age of 18. The school has approximately 754 pupils.

Cressex Community School has formed a partnership with nearby Wycombe Abbey independent school, which enables pupils from both schools to work together.

The school was allocated £31 million of Government funding in 2007 to completely redevelop the site, which was falling into disrepair. The current site was opened in 2010.
