= Wycombe Marsh =

Area of High Wycombe, Buckinghamshire, England

Coordinates: 51.616405°N 0.72263°W

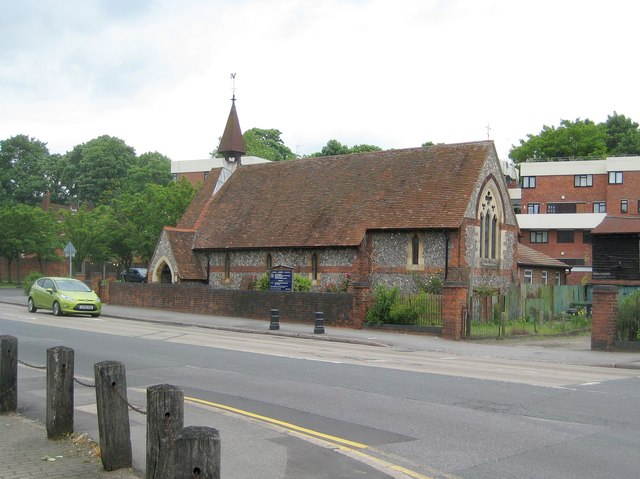
- St Anne's Church

- Location within Buckinghamshire
- OS grid reference: SU8892
- Civil parish: unparished
- Unitary authority: Buckinghamshire
- Ceremonial county: Buckinghamshire
- Region: South East
- Country: England
- Sovereign state: United Kingdom
- Post town: HIGH WYCOMBE
- Postcode district: HP11
- Dialling code: 01494
- Police: Thames Valley
- Fire: Buckinghamshire
- Ambulance: South Central
- UK Parliament: Wycombe

Wycombe Marsh is an area of High Wycombe, Buckinghamshire, England. It lies on the River Wye and the A40 road, approximately 1.5 miles (2.4 km) south-east of High Wycombe town centre, and approximately 1 mile (1.6 km) north-west of Loudwater. Wycombe Marsh is in the Ryemead ward of High Wycombe, which had a population of 7,188 at the 2011 census.

== Features ==
Wycombe Marsh is home to Wycombe Retail Park. There are multiple residential areas, including Wye Dene Estate. The area is served by Marsh Infant School and Nursery and three small churches.

Wycombe Marsh also lies on the abandoned section of the Wycombe Railway between High Wycombe and Bourne End, that opened in 1854 and closed in 1970. Trackbed can still be found in the area.

== History ==
Wycombe's location as a well-watered valley protected by higher ground, meant that it was favourable to prehistoric settlements, of which traces have been found at Wycombe Marsh dating from the Bronze Age. In previous centuries, Wycombe Marsh was home to mills and was engaged in the manufacture of paper. In the 21st century, Wycombe Marsh has undergone major redevelopment. Brownfield land such as Thames Water's redundant sewage treatment works has been converted into a retail park, and more recently, a housing development.
