= Hospital of St John the Baptist, High Wycombe =

Coordinates: 51.6269°N 0.7437°W

Hospital of St John the Baptist
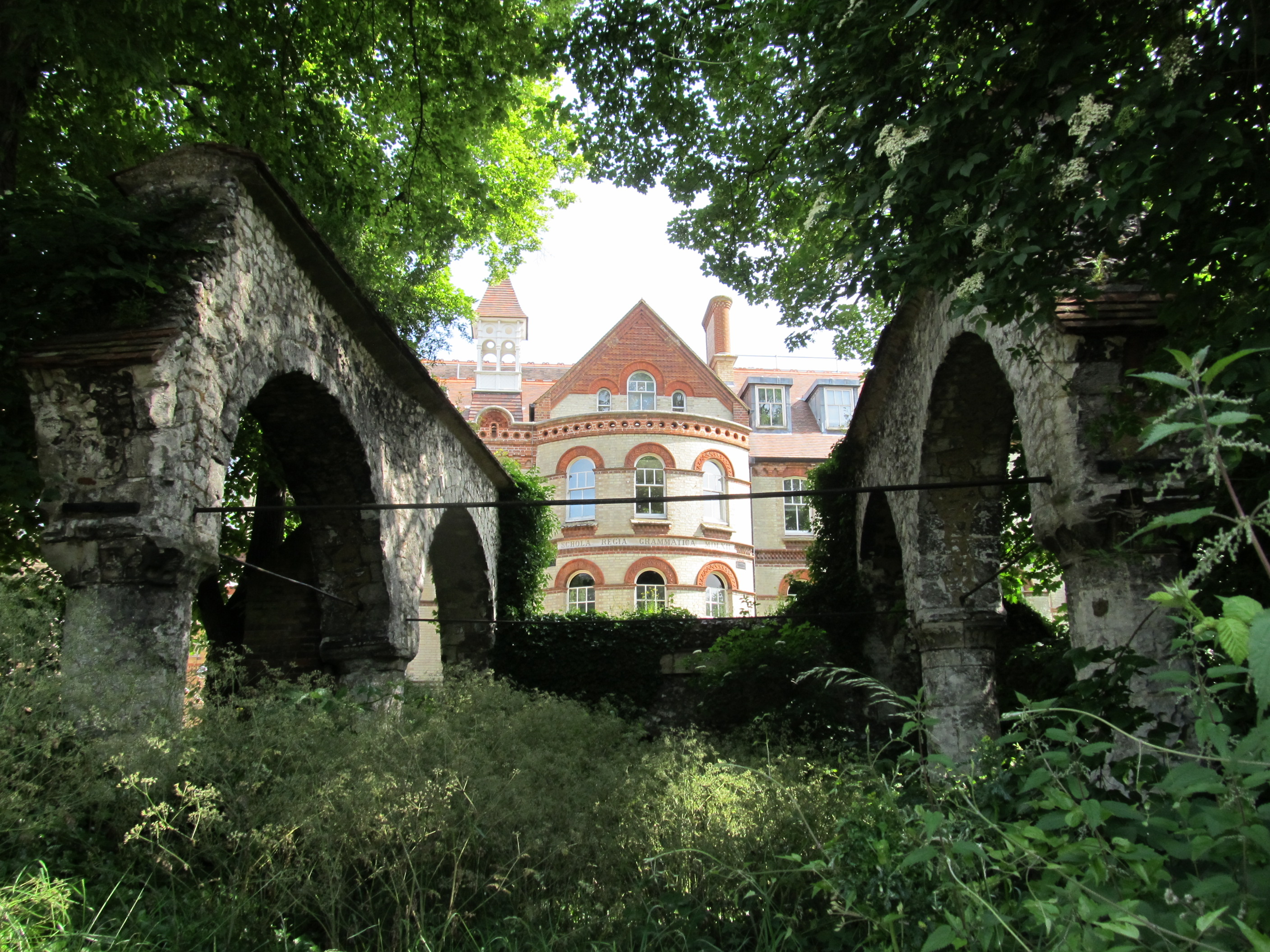
- The remains of the 12th Century Hospital of St. John the Baptist, High Wycombe

Geography
- Location: High Wycombe, England, United Kingdom

Services
- Emergency department: No Accident & Emergency

Helipads
- Helipad: No

History
- Founded: 1180
- Closed: 1548

Links
- Lists: Hospitals in England

The Hospital of St John the Baptist was a hospital in High Wycombe in Buckinghamshire, England, between 1180 and 1548. It was situated on the main road that ran from Oxford to London (what is now the A40) east of the town centre.

== The Hospital ==
In the 12th century hospitals were used as almshouses for the poor or infirm.

The Hospital of St John the Baptist was founded by the Catholic church. The foundation date is not recorded, but the surviving capitals suggest a date in the 1170s or '80s. The founder was perhaps one Adam Walder, as in an inquisition of 1245 it was recorded that the brethren and sisters of the house were to pray for his soul.

The hospital was run by a Master (normally a monk or other religious figure) and a small community of brothers and sisters (other members of the church) who cared for the people who came to them for help. Three further beds at the hospital were also set aside for other poor or infirm people who were passing through on the road either to London or to Oxford. The earliest known Master was Brother Gilbert who, in 1236, wrote to Pope Gregory IX in Rome asking for permission to establish a chapel dedicated to St John the Baptist at the hospital. This permission was granted by Papal decree in 1239 and the chapel built shortly after. It is not known whether the hospital took on the name of St John the Baptist at this time, or whether it had already received that dedication.

In 1245 a study found the brothers distributed bread to the poor annually on Lady Day (25 March). By 1344 the hospital was in the patronage of the mayor and burgess of Wycombe.

The hospital continued to run until the Dissolution of the Monasteries in the mid 16th century when all property belonging to the Catholic church was seized by King Henry VIII. Officially the property of the King from that point in history, the hospital struggled to survive and eventually closed in 1548. The last recorded Master was Charles Chalfont, who ran the hospital from 1541 to 1548.

== The school ==
In 1550 the buildings of the hospital were acquired by the mayor and burgesses of the town who wished to establish a school. The school took in boys by subscription and trained them in academic studies such as reading, writing, arithmetic and the classics. Most if not all of the boys who attended the school would have then gone on to university, probably at Oxford. In 1562 the school received a Royal charter from Queen Elizabeth I. From that point on the school was (and still is) known as the Royal Grammar School.

The school operated in the old hospital until 1883 when funds were found for a new building. This was constructed just to the north of the old hospital, and the ancient building was finally demolished. In 1915 the school was then moved from this location altogether to its current location on Amersham Hill.

== National Monument ==
Part of the original hospital building was pulled down in 1767 to make way for the widening of the main road so that it could be established as a turnpike. The south wall of the hall was taken down at this time, and the hall shortened from 15 metres to about 12 metres. At the time of demolition most of the remaining buildings were pulled down, but some parts of the building were left standing. This includes the north wall and five columns of the hall with four arches showing typical 12th century decoration and the north chapel wall with two half lattice windows from the 13th–14th centuries. These ruins still remain today.

At the end of the 19th century the ruins left from the original demolition were strengthened using brick buttresses; in the early 20th century the columns and both walls were given stronger foundations of cement.

In 1993 the ruins were declared an English national monument by English Heritage. Today they are well looked after and are lit up at night, making them a local landmark.

== Notes ==
- This name is recorded on the plaque that stands outside the hospital ruin. Others record this person as William Chalfont. Others record this person as Christopher Chalfont.
