= Loudwater, Buckinghamshire =

Village in Buckinghamshire, England

Coordinates: 51.606025°N 0.692297°W

Loudwater
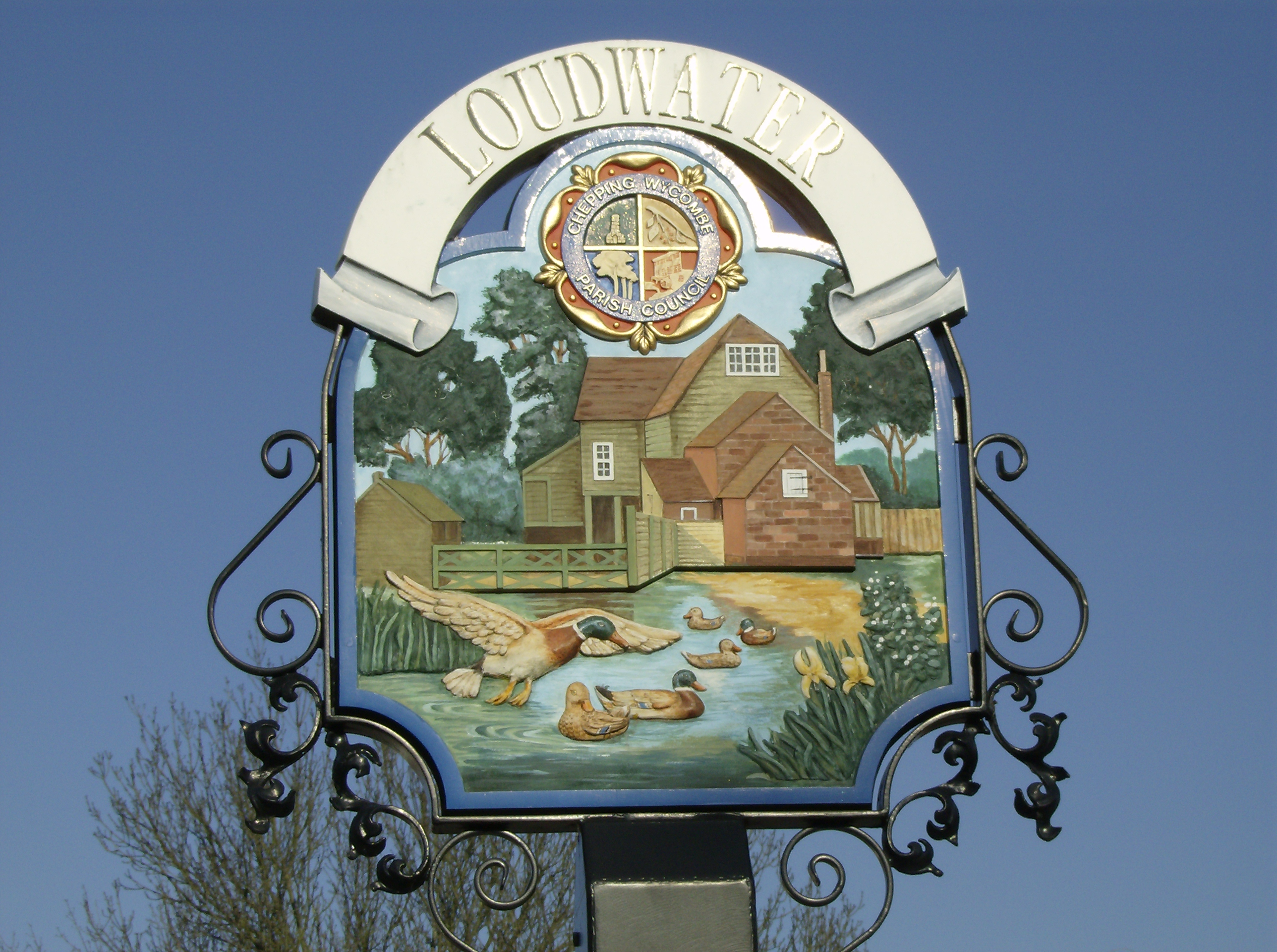
- Loudwater sign depicting a mill that once stood there

- Location within Buckinghamshire
- Population: 4,170
- OS grid reference: SU905905
- Civil parish: Chepping Wycombe
- Unitary authority: Buckinghamshire
- Ceremonial county: Buckinghamshire
- Region: South East
- Country: England
- Sovereign state: United Kingdom
- Post town: HIGH WYCOMBE
- Postcode district: HP10
- Dialling code: 01494, 01628
- Police: Thames Valley
- Fire: Buckinghamshire
- Ambulance: South Central
- UK Parliament: Beaconsfield

Loudwater is a village in the parish of Chepping Wycombe in Buckinghamshire, England. It is located in the valley to the east of High Wycombe, on the A40 London Road.

== History ==
The village name refers to the River Wye nearby, that also flows through High Wycombe. In manorial records in 1241 the village was referred to as La Ludewatere.

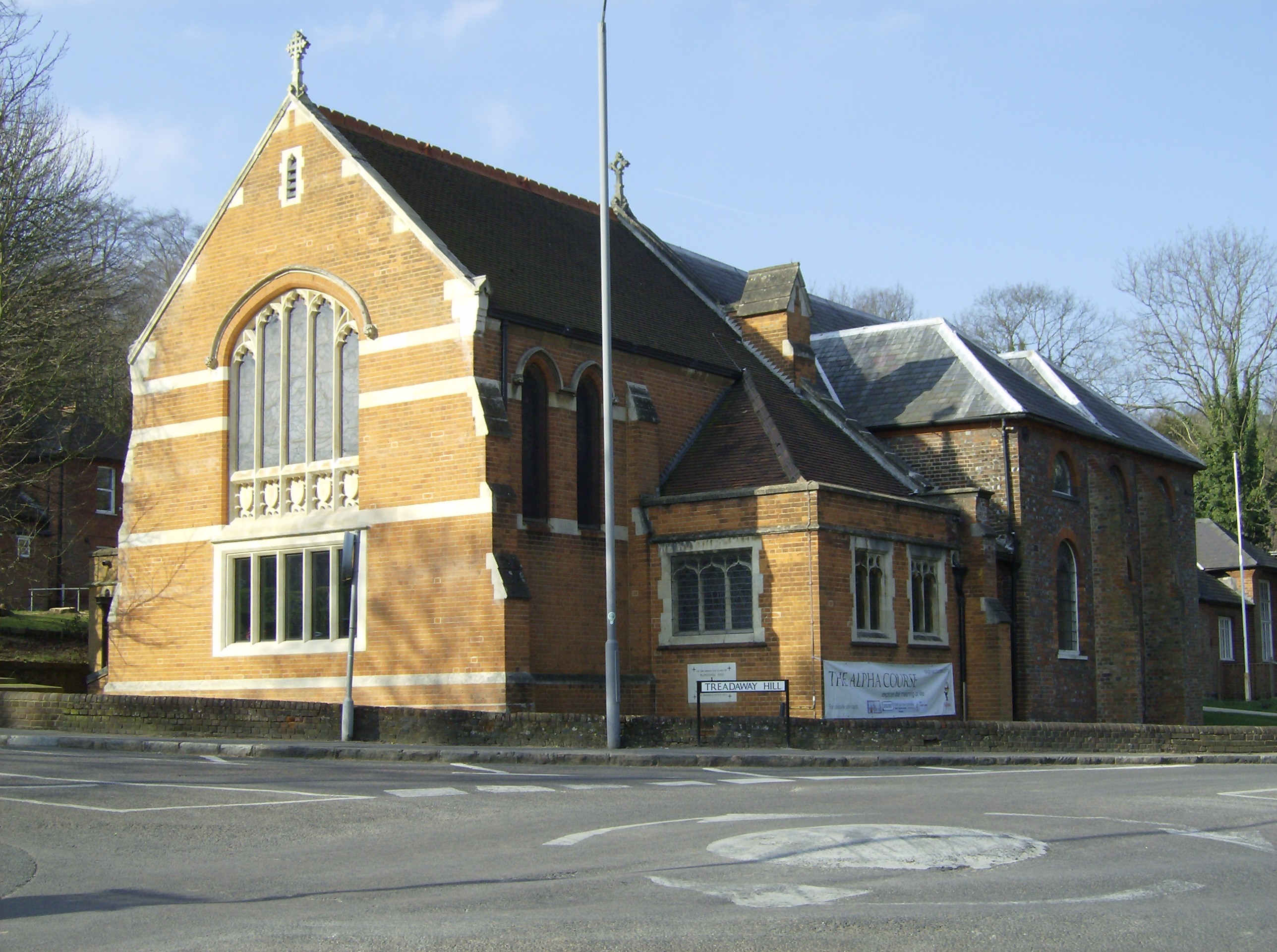
St Peter's Church, Loudwater

The brick built St Peter's Church dates from 1788 with a gothic style chancel added in 1903 and further improvements in recent years, including new windows. On the London Road there is a Victorian mansion called Burleighfield House that was once the studio of the stained glass designer Patrick Reyntiens.

There was once a blotting paper mill in the valley and Loudwater had its own railway station on the Wycombe Railway that opened in 1854 and closed in 1970.

Today there is little to distinguish the village from the urban sprawl of High Wycombe, though it is signed along the London Road. A 1744 milestone can still be seen and there is also still a traditional village pub 'The Derehams Inn' in Derehams Lane.

The Derehams Inn closed in 2021. However, there is an active Community Group trying to save it from residential development.

== Features ==
Loudwater is home to several retail and industrial concerns - a large Tesco supermarket, an industrial estate, a small retail park, a Brewers Fayre motel and also the office of the local newspaper, the Bucks Free Press. The M40 motorway crosses over the valley close to the village, and facilitates the eastbound only Junction 3, signposted as 'Wycombe East'.

Loudwater was once served by the High Wycombe to Bourne End railway line, the station being situated at the bottom of Treadaway Hill. The line and station closed in 1970, the old railway path can still be walked through Fennel Wood.

Loudwater is known as the Headquarters of Dreams beds, Costa Coffee and Fonehouse.

Loudwater has a primary school called Loudwater Combined School, located on Kingsmead Road.
