= Tylers Green =

Village in Buckinghamshire, England

Coordinates: 51°38′13″N 0°41′35″W

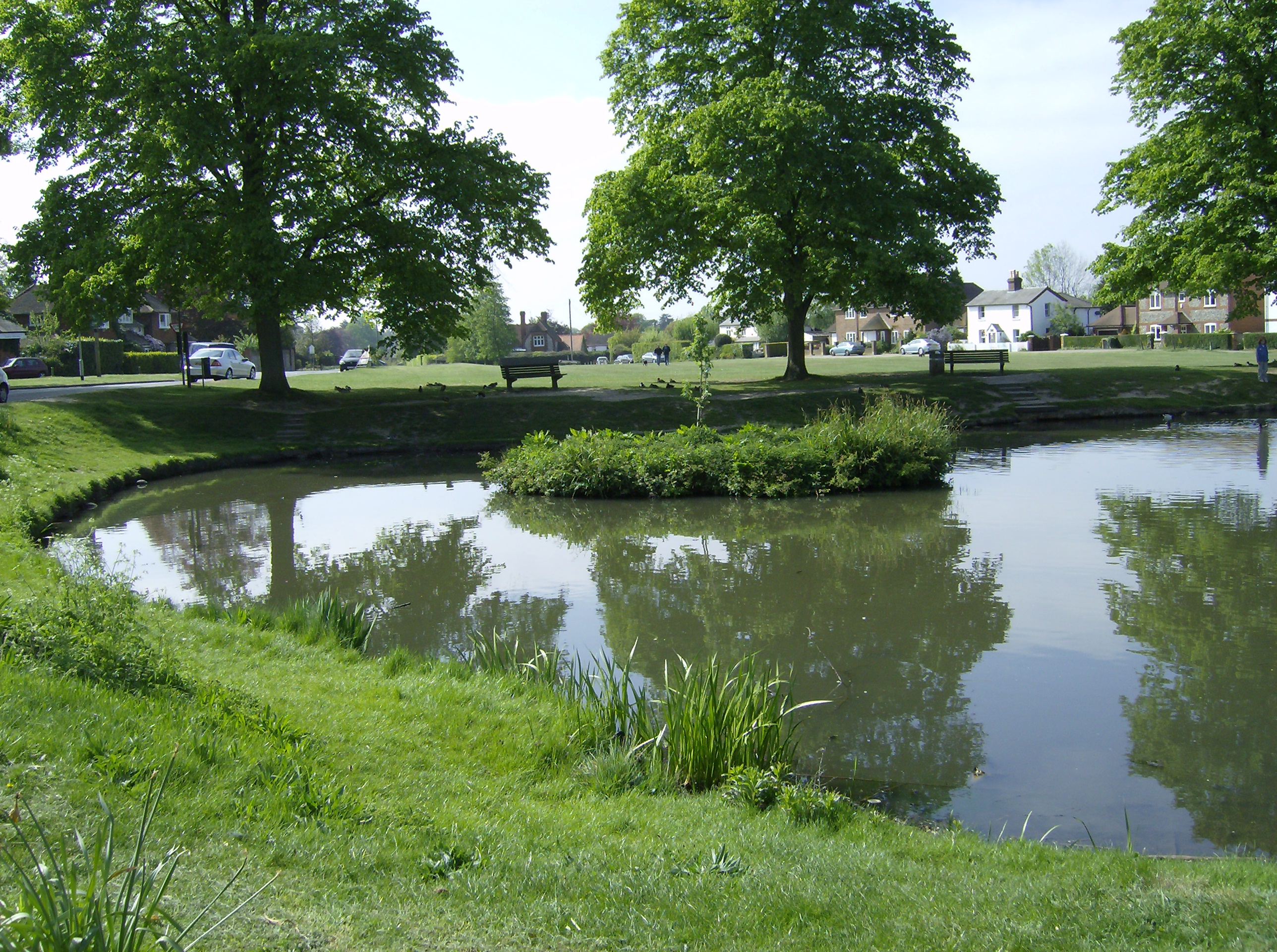
- Widmer Pond

- Location within Buckinghamshire
- OS grid reference: SU905940
- Civil parish: Chepping Wycombe
- Unitary authority: Buckinghamshire
- Ceremonial county: Buckinghamshire
- Region: South East
- Country: England
- Sovereign state: United Kingdom
- Post town: High Wycombe
- Postcode district: HP10
- Dialling code: 01494
- Police: Thames Valley
- Fire: Buckinghamshire
- Ambulance: South Central
- UK Parliament: Wycombe
- Website: Chepping Wycombe Parish Council

Tylers Green is a village in the civil parish of Chepping Wycombe, Buckinghamshire, England.

The village is adjoined on one side by Hazlemere and on the other by Penn. "Penn and Tylers Green" are often referred to as one. Tylers Green centres on a village green where an annual fête is held. In one corner of the green is a duck pond.

== History ==
Artefacts have been found suggesting habitation in Penn and Tylers Green since the Stone Age. In the 12th century, the village was known as Garretts Green. By the 14th century, the name was changed to Tiler End Green as it became known for well-organized commercial tile workshops.

In 2006, Thames Valley Police cordoned off the woodland between Tylers Green, Totteridge, Micklefield and High Wycombe (Kingswood) for a fingertip search for evidence linked to the 2006 transatlantic aircraft plot. The woodland remained cordoned off for four months before being reopened in November 2006.

== Geography ==
The village is in the Chiltern Hills and from here there are many walks through beech woodland which once supplied the furniture industry in High Wycombe.

== Amenities ==
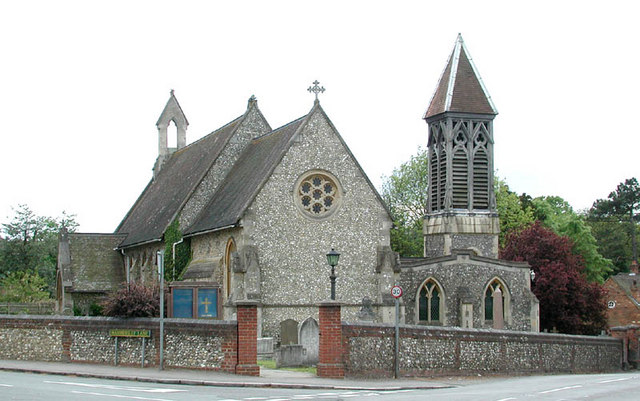
St Margaret, Tylers Green

The Church of England parish church of St Margaret was built in 1854 of flint and stone and is Grade II listed. The wooden bell-turret was added in 1891. The ashes of Arthur Whitten Brown, the navigator of the 1919 Transatlantic flight of Alcock and Brown, the first non-stop crossing of the Atlantic, are buried in St Margaret's churchyard.

The village has two schools, Tylers Green First School for children aged 4 – 7 and Tylers Green Middle School for children aged 7 – 11.

It has its own football club, Penn & Tylers Green F. C, which was established in 1905.

== Sources and further reading ==
- Page, W.H., ed. (1925). A History of the County of Buckingham, Volume 3. Victoria County History. pp. 112–134.
- Pevsner, Nikolaus (1960). Buckinghamshire. The Buildings of England. Harmondsworth: Penguin Books. p. 271. ISBN 0-14-071019-1.
