= List of schools in Buckinghamshire =

This is a list of schools in Buckinghamshire, England, in that part of the county under the authority of Buckinghamshire Council.

== State-funded schools ==
=== Primary schools ===
- Abbey View Primary Academy, High Wycombe
- Ash Hill Primary School, High Wycombe
- Ashmead Combined School, Aylesbury
- Aston Clinton School, Aston Clinton
- The Aylesbury Vale Academy, Aylesbury
- Bearbrook Combined School, Aylesbury
- Bedgrove Infant School, Aylesbury
- Bedgrove Junior School, Aylesbury
- Beechview Academy, High Wycombe
- Bierton CE Combined School, Bierton
- Bledlow Ridge School, Bledlow Ridge
- Booker Hill School, High Wycombe
- Bourton Meadow Academy, Buckingham
- Brill CE School, Brill
- Brookmead School, Ivinghoe
- Broughton Infant School, Broughton
- Broughton Junior School, Broughton
- Brushwood Junior School, Chesham
- Buckingham Park CE Primary School, Buckingham Park
- Buckingham Primary School, Buckingham
- Burford School, Marlow Bottom
- Butlers Court School, Beaconsfield
- Cadmore End CE School, Cadmore End
- Carrington Infant School, Flackwell Heath
- Carrington Junior School, Flackwell Heath
- Castlefield School, High Wycombe
- Cedar Park School, Hazlemere
- Chalfont St Giles Infant School and Nursery, Chalfont St Giles
- Chalfont St Giles Junior School, Chalfont St Giles
- Chalfont St Peter CE Academy, Chalfont St Peter
- Chalfont St Peter Infant School, Chalfont St Peter
- Chalfont Valley E-ACT Primary Academy, Little Chalfont
- Chartridge Combined School, Chartridge
- Cheddington Combined School, Cheddington
- Chenies School, Chenies
- Chepping View Primary Academy, High Wycombe
- Chesham Bois CE School, Chesham Bois
- Chestnut Lane School, Amersham
- Claytons Primary School, Bourne End
- Coleshill CE Infant School, Coleshill
- Cuddington and Dinton CE School, Cuddington
- Curzon CE Combined School, Penn
- Dagnall CE School, Dagnall
- Danesfield School, Medmenham
- Denham Green E-Act Primary Academy, Denham
- Denham Village School, Denham
- The Disraeli School, High Wycombe
- Dorney School, Dorney Reach
- The Downley School, Downley
- Drayton Parslow Village School, Drayton Parslow
- Dropmore Infant School, Dropmore
- East Claydon CE School, East Claydon
- Edlesborough Primary Academy, Edlesborough
- Elangeni School, Amersham
- Elmhurst School, Aylesbury
- Elmtree Infant and Nursery School, Chesham
- Farnham Common Infant School, Farnham Common
- Farnham Common Junior School, Farnham Common
- Foxes Piece School, Marlow
- Frieth CE Combined School, Frieth
- Fulmer Infant School, Fulmer
- George Grenville Academy, Buckingham
- The Gerrards Cross CE School, Gerrards Cross
- Great Horwood CE School, Great Horwood
- Great Kimble CE School, Great Kimble
- Great Kingshill CE Combined School, Cryers Hill
- Great Missenden CE Combined School, Great Missenden
- Green Ridge Primary Academy, Berryfields
- Grendon Underwood Combined School, Grendon Underwood
- Haddenham Community Infant School, Haddenham
- Haddenham Community Junior School, Haddenham
- Haddenham St Mary's CE School, Haddenham
- Halton Community Combined School, Halton
- Hamilton Academy, High Wycombe
- Hannah Ball School, High Wycombe
- Hawridge and Cholesbury CE School, Hawridge
- Haydon Abbey School, Aylesbury
- Hazlemere CE Combined School, Hazlemere
- High Ash CE Combined School, Great Brickhill
- High Wycombe CE Combined School, High Wycombe
- Highworth Combined School and Nursery, High Wycombe
- Holmer Green Infant School, Holmer Green
- Holmer Green Junior School, Holmer Green
- Holtspur School, Holtspur
- Holy Trinity CE School, Marlow
- Hughenden Primary School, Hughenden Valley
- Hyde Heath Infant School, Hyde Heath
- Ibstone CE Primary School, Ibstone
- Ickford School, Ickford
- Iver Heath Infant School and Nursery, Iver Heath
- Iver Heath Junior School, Iver Heath
- Iver Village Infant School, Iver
- The Iver Village Junior School, Iver
- Ivingswood Academy, Chesham
- The John Hampden School, Wendover
- Jordans School, Jordans
- Juniper Hill School, Flackwell Heath
- King's Wood School, High Wycombe
- Kingsbrook View Primary Academy, Broughton
- Lace Hill Academy, Buckingham
- Lane End Primary School, Lane End
- Lee Common CE School, Lee Common
- Lent Rise School, Burnham
- Ley Hill School, Ley Hill
- Little Chalfont Primary School, Little Chalfont
- Little Kingshill Combined School, Little Kingshill
- Little Marlow CE School, Little Marlow
- Little Missenden CE School, Little Missenden
- Long Crendon School, Long Crendon
- Longwick CE Combined School, Longwick
- Loudwater Combined School, Loudwater
- Maids Moreton CE School, Maids Moreton
- Manor Farm Community Infant School, Hazlemere
- Manor Farm Junior School, Hazlemere
- Marlow CE Infant School, Marlow
- Marsh Gibbon CE Primary School, Marsh Gibbon
- Marsh School, High Wycombe
- Marsworth CE Infant School, Marsworth
- Millbrook Combined School, High Wycombe
- Monks Risborough CE Primary School, Monks Risborough
- Mursley CE School, Mursley
- Naphill and Walters Ash School, Walters Ash
- Newton Longville CE Combined School, Newton Longville
- Newtown School, Chesham
- North Marston CE School, North Marston
- Oak Green School, Aylesbury
- Oakley CE Combined School, Oakley
- Oakridge School, High Wycombe
- Orchard View Primary Academy, Bierton
- Our Lady's RC Primary School, Chesham Bois
- Overstone Combined School, Wing
- Padbury CE School, Padbury
- Prestwood Infant School, Prestwood
- Prestwood Junior School, Prestwood
- Princes Risborough Primary School, Princes Risborough
- Quainton CE Combined School, Quainton
- Radnage CE Primary School, Radnage
- Robertswood School, Chalfont St Peter
- Roundwood Primary School, Gawcott
- St Edwards RC Junior School, Aylesbury
- St George's CE Infant School, Amersham
- St James and St John CE Primary School, Chackmore
- St John's CE Primary School, Lacey Green
- St Joseph's RC Infant School, Aylesbury
- St Joseph's RC Primary School, Chalfont St Peter
- St Louis RC Primary School, Aylesbury
- St Mary & All Saints CE Primary School, Beaconsfield
- St Mary's CE Primary School, Amersham
- St Mary's CE School, Aylesbury
- St Mary's Farnham Royal CE Primary School, Farnham Royal
- St Michael's RC School, High Wycombe
- St Michael's CE Combined School, Stewkley
- St Nicolas' CE Combined School, Taplow
- St Paul's CE Combined School, Wooburn
- St Peter's CE Combined School, Burnham
- St Peter's RC Primary School, Marlow
- Seer Green CE School, Seer Green
- Speen CE School, Speen
- Spinfield School, Marlow
- Steeple Claydon School, Steeple Claydon
- Stoke Mandeville Combined School, Stoke Mandeville
- The Stoke Poges School, Stoke Poges
- Stokenchurch Primary School, Stokenchurch
- Stone CE Combined School, Stone
- Swanbourne CE School, Swanbourne
- Thomas Harding Junior School, Chesham
- Thomas Hickman School, Aylesbury
- Thornborough Infant School, Thornborough
- Turnfurlong Infant School, Aylesbury
- Turnfurlong Junior School, Aylesbury
- Twyford CE School, Twyford
- Tylers Green First School, Tylers Green
- Tylers Green Middle School, Tylers Green
- Waddesdon Village Primary School, Waddesdon
- Waterside Primary Academy, Chesham
- Wendover CE Junior School, Wendover
- West Wycombe School, West Wycombe
- Weston Turville CE School, Weston Turville
- Whaddon CE School, Whaddon
- Whitchurch Combined School, Whitchurch
- Widmer End Community Combined School, Widmer End
- William Harding School, Aylesbury
- Wingrave CE Combined School, Wingrave
- Winslow CE School, Winslow
- Wooburn Green Primary School, Wooburn Green
- Woodside Junior School, Amersham

=== Non-selective secondary schools ===
- Amersham School, Amersham
- The Aylesbury Vale Academy, Aylesbury
- The Beaconsfield School, Beaconsfield
- Bourne End Academy, Bourne End
- Buckingham School, Buckingham
- Buckinghamshire University Technical College, Aylesbury
- Chalfonts Community College, Chalfont St Peter
- Chiltern Hills Academy, Chesham
- The Cottesloe School, Wing
- Cressex Community School, High Wycombe
- The Grange School, Aylesbury
- Great Marlow School, Marlow
- Highcrest Academy, High Wycombe
- Holmer Green Senior School, Holmer Green
- John Colet School, Wendover
- The Kingsbrook School, Broughton
- Mandeville School, Aylesbury
- The Misbourne School, Great Missenden
- Pioneer Secondary Academy, Stoke Poges
- Princes Risborough School, Princes Risborough
- St Michael's RC School, High Wycombe
- Sir Thomas Fremantle School, Winslow
- Sir William Ramsay School, Hazlemere
- Waddesdon Church of England School, Waddesdon

=== Grammar schools ===
- Aylesbury Grammar School, Aylesbury
- Aylesbury High School, Aylesbury
- Beaconsfield High School, Beaconsfield
- Burnham Grammar School, Burnham
- Chesham Grammar School, Chesham
- Dr Challoner's Grammar School, Amersham
- Dr Challoner's High School, Little Chalfont
- John Hampden Grammar School, High Wycombe
- Royal Grammar School, High Wycombe
- Royal Latin School, Buckingham
- Sir Henry Floyd Grammar School, Aylesbury
- Sir William Borlase's Grammar School, Marlow
- Wycombe High School, High Wycombe

=== Special and alternative schools ===
- Alfriston School, Knotty Green
- Aspire, High Wycombe
- Booker Park School, Aylesbury
- The Buckinghamshire Primary Pupil Referral Unit, Aylesbury
- Chiltern Way Academy, Prestwood/Wendover
- Chiltern Wood School, High Wycombe
- Furze Down School, Winslow
- Heritage House School, Chesham
- Kite Ridge School, High Wycombe
- Pebble Brook School, Aylesbury
- Stocklake Park Community School, Aylesbury
- Stony Dean School, Amersham
- Westfield School, Bourne End

=== Further education ===
- Amersham and Wycombe College, Amersham & High Wycombe
- Aylesbury College, Aylesbury

== Independent schools ==
=== Primary and preparatory schools ===
- Ashfold School, Dorton
- Beachborough School, Westbury
- The Beacon School, Chesham Bois
- Caldicott School, Farnham Royal
- Chesham Preparatory School, Orchard Leigh
- Crown House School, High Wycombe
- Dair House School, Farnham Royal
- Davenies School, Beaconsfield
- Gateway School, Great Missenden
- Gayhurst School, Chalfont St Peter
- Godstowe Preparatory School, High Wycombe
- Griffin House School, Little Kimble
- Heatherton School, Amersham
- High March School, Beaconsfield
- Maltman's Green School, Chalfont St Peter
- Swanbourne House School, Swanbourne

=== Senior and all-through schools ===
- Akeley Wood School, Lillingstone Dayrell
- The Chalfonts Independent Grammar School, Chalfont St Giles
- International School of Creative Arts, Wexham
- Pipers Corner School, Great Kingshill
- St Mary's School, Gerrards Cross
- Stowe School, Stowe
- Teikyo School United Kingdom, Wexham
- Thornton College, Thornton
- Thorpe House School, Chalfont St Peter
- Wycombe Abbey, High Wycombe

=== Special and alternative schools ===
- Benjamin College, Fairford Leys
- Eton Dorney Independent Therapeutic School, Dorney
- MacIntyre School, Wingrave
- The PACE Centre, Aylesbury
- Progress Schools - Buckinghamshire, High Wycombe
- Unity College, High Wycombe
