= Waddesdon Church of England School =

Location
- Waddesdon, Buckinghamshire; England; 51.842836°N 0.920225°W

Information
- Type: Academy
- Religious affiliation: Christian – Church of England
- Established: 1962
- Specialists: Visual Arts; Mathematics & Computing
- Department for Education URN: 137355 Tables
- Ofsted: Reports
- Headteacher: Matthew Abbott
- Gender: Co-educational
- Age: 11 to 18
- Enrolment: 1000
- Colours: Green and Black
- Publication: Waddesdon Voice
- Website: http://www.waddesdonschool.com/

Waddesdon Church of England School is a mixed secondary school in the village of Waddesdon, in Buckinghamshire. In September 2011 the school became an Academy. It takes children from the age of 11 through to the age of 18 and has approximately 1000 pupils, including a sixth form of approximately 200 students. It is a Church of England school and is the only CofE secondary school in Buckinghamshire. It is administered by the Oxford Diocese.

The school was opened in July 1962 with about 200 students. It was built on land from the Waddesdon Manor estate, which was donated by Dorothy de Rothschild. The school maintains a close relationship with the Rothschild family and the school badge combines the five arrows from the Rothschild coat of arms with the Christian symbol of the cross.

Ofsted has judged the school to be "outstanding" on three successive inspections, and the school is included in Ofsted's outstanding providers list.

Waddesdon School was awarded Beacon school status in September 1998 and this was renewed in March 2001. The Beacon Schools programme was phased out in 2005 and was replaced with the Leading Edge Partnership programme. In September 2004, Waddesdon became the lead school in the Aylesbury Vale Leading Edge Partnership, which also included The Grange School and Quarrendon School.

In September 2003 the school was awarded specialist school status as a Visual Arts College, by the Department for Education and Skills (DfES). In December 2007 the school was awarded a second specialism in Mathematics and Computing.

Since September 2006, Waddesdon has been part of the Buckingham School Sports Partnership. The partnership is led by the Buckingham School, which has specialist Sports College status, and also includes the Cottesloe and Royal Latin secondary schools, as well as about forty local primary schools. Waddesdon School also has Sportsmark status from Sport England, recognising its PE and games provision.

== School site ==
The school is located on the edge of Waddesdon, away from the A41 road which bisects the village. It adjoins the Waddesdon Estate and open countryside.

Over the years the school has grown significantly and various buildings have been added or refurbished to meet the school's needs. The main buildings date from the original opening of the school in 1962. They contain the school hall, library, canteen and drama studios, as well as a variety of classrooms and school offices. The science labs are contained in the Parker building. The Dorothy de Rothschild building, which was opened by Lord and Lady Rothschild in 1999, housed the school's Maths and Information and Communication Technology (ICT) departments, and is now the home of the Languages & Computing specialism. The Thorp building is named after the Reverend Tom Thorp, a former Chairman of Governors, who died in office in 2003. The building was officially opened in 2005 and named in his memory. It includes a teaching block that houses the Maths department, a suite of art studios and a sports hall. In 2007 the school added a new all-weather pitch to its sports facilities. The sports facilities were named "The Alan Armstrong Sports Complex" in honour of the former headteacher and former PE teacher.

=== Facilities ===
The following facilities are available for students at Waddesdon Church of England School:

- The Sixth Form Common Room: This has been designed with relaxation in mind; Perfect for R&R periods.
- Sixth Form Study Centre: The Study Centre is equipped with computers, wireless internet access and provide a quiet atmosphere for independent study.
- The Cedars Restaurant: The Cedars provides meals and snacks.
- Information Technology: The ICT department in the Rothschild building is open throughout the day, including sessions before and after school.
- Science: The Science department has 7 laboratories, 4 of which have recently been refurbished to a very high standard.
- Digital Art and Music Technology: Both subjects have dedicated ICT facilities equipped with Apple Mac computers.
- Physical Education: The PE department is housed in the Thorp Building and comprises a large sports hall, fitness and weights room, and floodlit Astroturf.

== Organisation ==
=== Houses ===
In 1963, shortly after its opening, the school introduced a house system, with four houses competing against each other in sports and academic endeavours. The four houses were called Courtney, Lipscomb, Dixon and Goodwin. The house system was discontinued in 2001, in favour of a system focused on year groups. This new arrangement still retains the previous competitions, but they are now solely between the forms within each year group.

=== Year groups ===
The school promotes a learning culture based on year groups. Each year group focuses on a specific learning target. Each year group also has their own title, colour and motto to create a year group identity. The details are as follows:

Year Group	Title	Colour	Target	Motto
Year 7	The Waddesdon Way	Green	Organisation	"Treat others with dignity and respect"
Year 8	Aim Higher	Sky Blue	The acquisition of knowledge and Life skills	"The sky's the limit"
Year 9	Within the Community	Red	Sharing knowledge	"Take an active part"
Year 10	Responsibility and Reality	Purple	Time Management	"I can and I care"
Year 11	Run the race : the final lap	Gold	Self-assessment	"Go for PB (Personal Best)"

== Headteachers ==
Since its opening in 1962, Waddesdon School has had five headteachers.

=== Alan Armstrong (1985–2007) ===
Alan Armstrong joined the school in 1985, and led it for twenty two years. During that time the school increased in size and added a sixth form. The school was adjudged to be "outstanding" in three successive Ofsted reports, and repeatedly improved its exam results. Mr Armstrong and Waddesdon School also supported other local schools, particularly the Grange and Quarrendon schools. In 2006 he was identified as an outstanding leader by the National College for School Leadership and included in their initial list of sixty eight National Leaders of Education. Mr Armstrong retired at Easter 2007.

=== Peter Norman (2007–2017) ===
Peter Norman joined the school in 2007. He had previously been the headteacher of The Warriner School, Bloxham in Oxfordshire, and had also worked in several local schools, including Aylesbury Grammar School, Bicester Community College and Lord Williams's School in Thame.

=== Matthew Abbot (2017-) ===
Matthew Abbot was previously deputy headteacher before taking over as headteacher when Peter Norman retired.

== Partner Schools ==
Waddesdon Church of England School has very strong links with the local community and works with the following partner schools:

- Waddesdon Village Primary School
- Whitchurch Combined School
- Grendon Underwood Combined School
- Westcott Church of England School
- Quainton Church of England Combined School
- Haddenham St Mary's Church of England School
- The Buckingham School
- John Colet School
- Blueprint
- The Grange School
- Aylesbury Vale Academy
