= Ringshall, Berkhamsted =

Coordinates: 51°49′N 0°34′W

Ringshall
- Hamlet
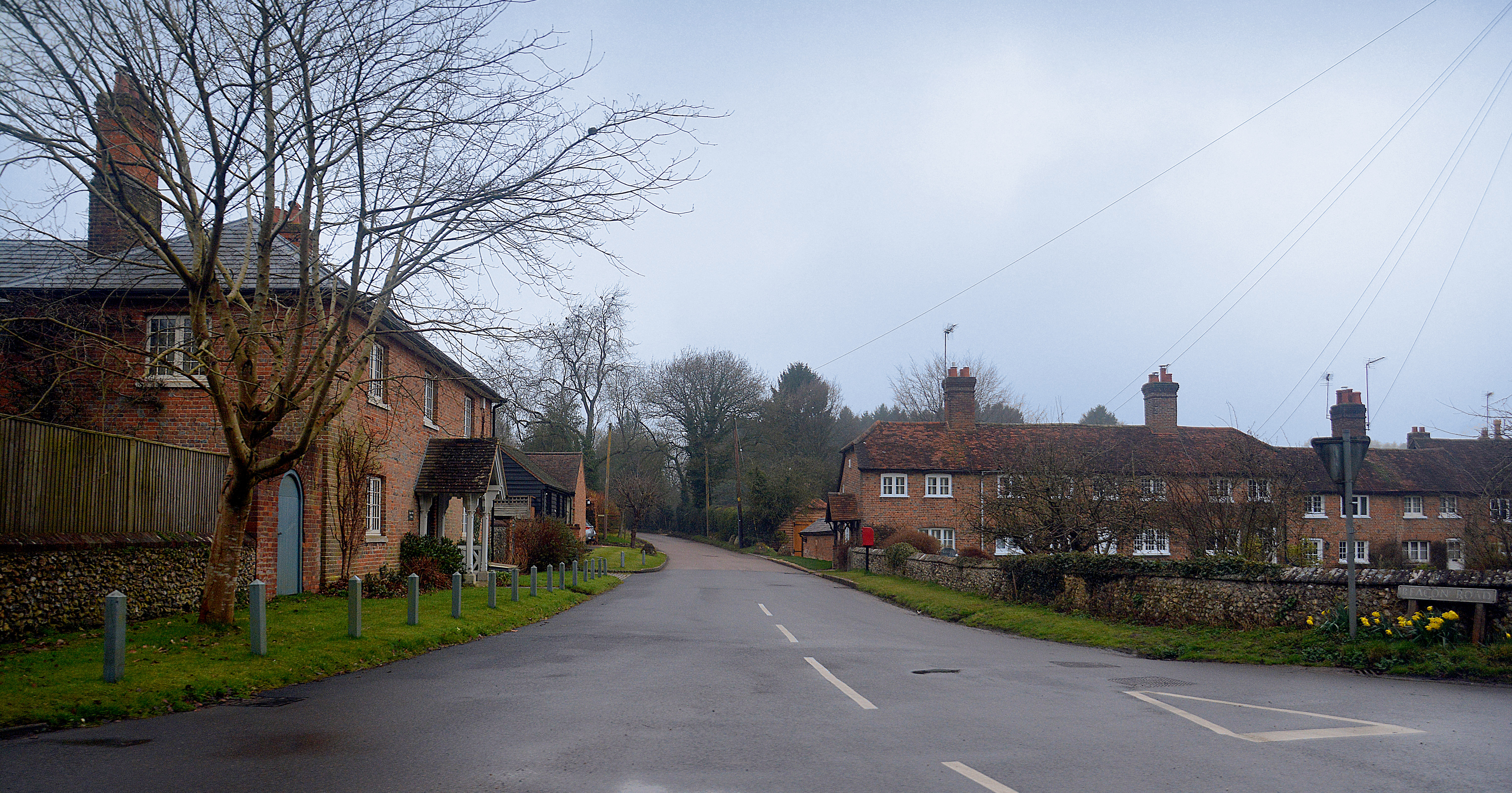
- Cottages on Beacon Road in Ringshall

- Location within Hertfordshire
- OS grid reference: SP9814
- Civil parish: Little Gaddesden
- District: Dacorum
- Shire county: Hertfordshire
- Ceremonial county: Hertfordshire
- Region: East
- Country: England
- Sovereign state: United Kingdom
- Post town: Berkhamsted
- Postcode district: HP4
- Dialling code: 01442
- Police: Hertfordshire
- Fire: Hertfordshire
- Ambulance: East of England
- UK Parliament: Hemel Hempstead

Ringshall is a hamlet in the Chiltern Hills of England. It is located on the border of the counties of Buckinghamshire and Hertfordshire; parts of the village lie in the civil parishes of Edlesborough and Ivinghoe in eastern Buckinghamshire, while the rest of the village is mainly within the parish of Little Gaddesden (where the population was included) in the west of Hertfordshire. Ringshall lies within the HP4 postcode and the postal address designated by Royal Mail is "Ringshall, Berkhamsted".

== History ==
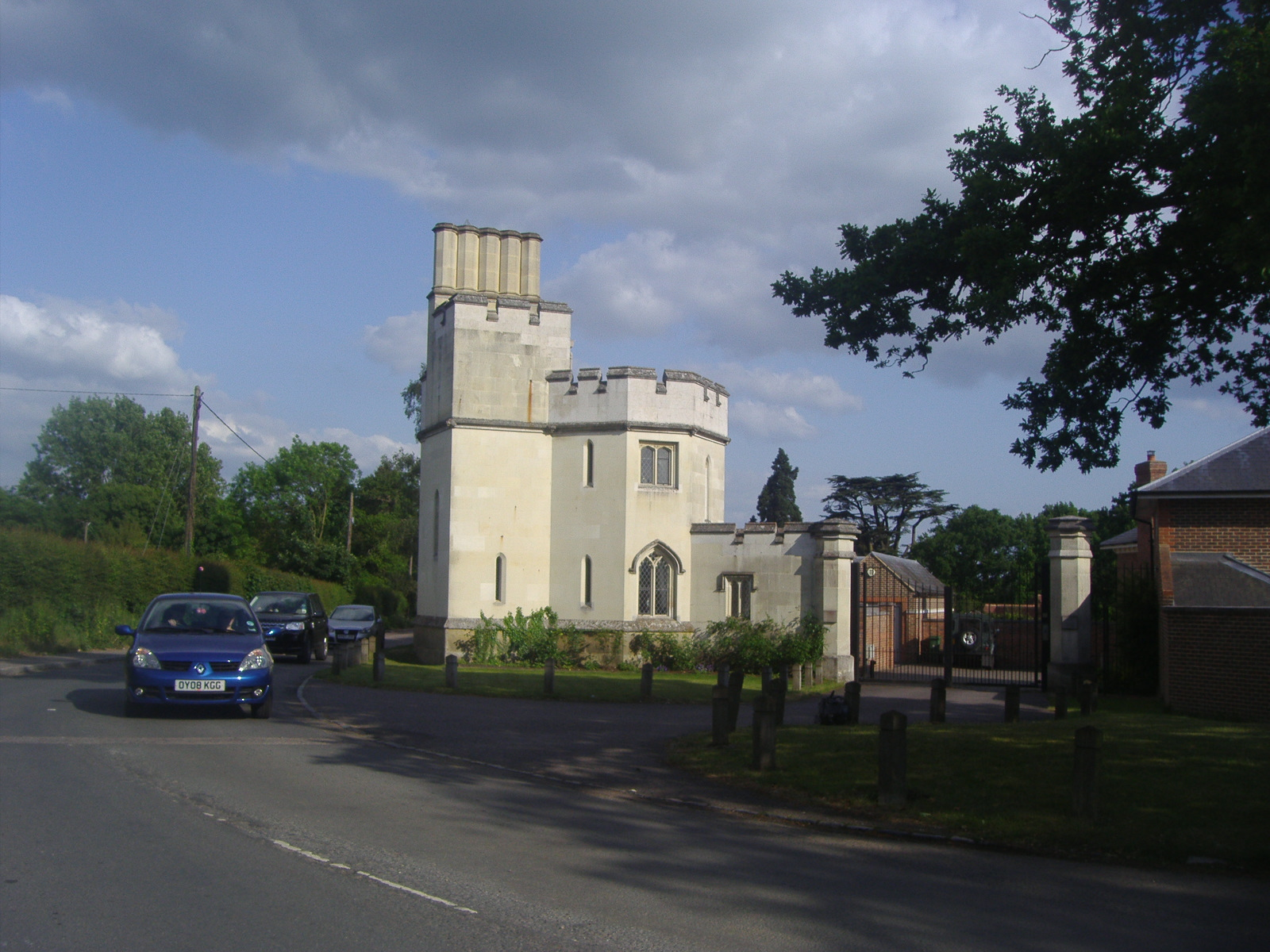
The Gatehouse on Nettleden Road, Ringshall

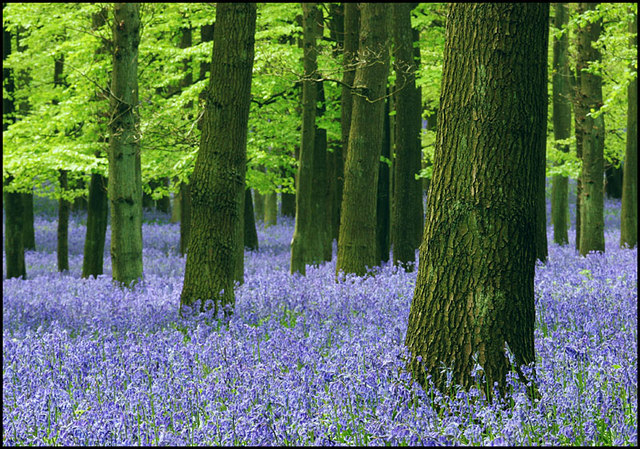
Bluebells in Dockey Wood

Ringshall is one of four place-names in the parish of Edlesborough Northall and Dagnall that have an origin with the suffix healh; the others being Dagnall, Hudnall and Northall. Ringshall-Hall Farm is situated in the Edlesborough part, but the hamlet was always appendant to Ivinghoe. The Ivinghoe part of the hamlet was transferred to Little Gaddesden in 1895, but some houses have since been built along Beacon Road in the area that remained as part of Ivinghoe parish.

== Landmarks ==
Ringshall is close to Ashridge House, a former stately home that is now in use as a management college. A crenellated Gothic Revival stone gatehouse stands in Ringshall at an entrance to the Ashridge estate which was probably designed 1808-1813 by James Wyatt, architect of Ashridge House.

Ringshall lies on the edge of the Ashridge Commons and Woods, an extensive a country estate of dense woodland which is managed by the National Trust. Moneybury Hill, a woodland next to Ringshall, is especially noted as it was landscaped by the celebrated English landscape architect Capability Brown between 1759 and 1768 for the Francis Egerton, 3rd Duke of Bridgewater. Nearby Dockey Wood is also noted as an example of bluebell woods.

From the 1930s to the 1990s, the Deer Leap swimming pool operated in Ringshall, drawing large numbers of visitors to the hamlet.
