= List of settlements in Buckinghamshire by population =

Buckinghamshire's 24 largest settlements. Its city is in bold and district centres in yellow.

This is a list of settlements in Buckinghamshire by population based on the results of the 2021 census. The next United Kingdom census will take place in 2031. In 2021, there were 25 built-up area subdivisions with 5,000 or more inhabitants in Buckinghamshire, shown in the table below.

== Population ranking ==
#	Settlement	Unitary Authority	Population			
#	Settlement	Unitary Authority	2001	2011	2021	Change (2011-2021) (%)
1	Milton Keynes	Milton Keynes	135,661	170,866	197,340	+15.5%
2	Aylesbury	Buckinghamshire	65,973	72,490	87,950	+21.3%
3	High Wycombe	Buckinghamshire	68,510	75,858	83,950	+10.7%
4	Bletchley	Milton Keynes	34,540	37,119	45,010	+21.3%
5	Chesham	Buckinghamshire	20,896	22,058	23,695	+7.4%
6	Hazlemere	Buckinghamshire	20,201	20,310	20,005	−1.5%
7	Amersham	Buckinghamshire	15,554	16,733	17,380	+3.9%
8	Newport Pagnell	Milton Keynes	14,426	14,785	15,250	+3.1%
9	Marlow	Buckinghamshire	13,958	14,211	14,645	+3.1%
10	Buckingham	Buckinghamshire	11,572	12,043	14,295	+18.7%
11	Beaconsfield	Buckinghamshire	12,312	13,839	14,145	+2.2%
12	Chalfont St Peter	Buckinghamshire	12,659	13,034	13,050	+0.1%
13	Flackwell Heath	Buckinghamshire	11,831	12,373	12,435	+0.5%
14	Wendover	Buckinghamshire	7,630	7,416	8,730	+17.7%
15	Gerrard's Cross	Buckinghamshire	6,923	7,599	8,135	+7.1%
16	Prestwood	Buckinghamshire	7,577	7,747	7,595	−2.0%
17	Princes Risborough	Buckinghamshire	6,923	7,062	7,530	+6.6%
18	Bourne End	Buckinghamshire	6,634	6,809	7,170	+5.3%
19	Farnham Common	Buckinghamshire	5,766	6,310	6,715	+6.4%
20	Olney	Milton Keynes	6,032	6,477	6,600	+1.9%
21	Little Chalfont	Buckinghamshire	5,297	5,622	6,505	+15.7%
22	Haddenham	Buckinghamshire	4,720	4,391	5,605	+27.6%
23	Aston Clinton	Buckinghamshire	4,030	4,216	5,510	+30.7%
24	Winslow	Buckinghamshire	4,519	4,407	5,235	+18.8%
25	Iver Heath	Buckinghamshire	4,677	5,009	5,150	+2.8%

== See also ==
- Buckinghamshire
- List of towns and cities in England by population
