= Frank Johnston (priest) =

Anglican priest and military chaplain born 1930

The Venerable Frank Johnston CB QHC
- The Venerable William Francis Johnston, CB, QHC, MA, Chaplain-General (1980–1987) by Peter Archer. Royal Army Chaplains' Museum
- Military career
- Allegiance: United Kingdom
- Branch: British Army
- Service years: 1959 to 1987
- Rank: Major General
- Service number: 459970
- Unit: Royal Army Chaplains' Department
- Conflicts: Cold War

Orders
- Ordination: 1955 (deacon); 1956 (priest)

Personal details
- Born: William Francis Johnston; 29 June 1930
- Died: 1 September 2023 (aged 93)
- Denomination: Anglicanism
- Spouse: Jennifer (m. 1963)
- Children: Three
- Education: Wesley College, Dublin; Trinity College, Dublin

William Francis 'Frank' Johnston, CB, QHC (29 June 1930 – 1 September 2023), was an Anglican priest and military chaplain. Between 1980 and 1986, he served as Chaplain-General to the Forces and head of the Royal Army Chaplains' Department, British Army.

== Early life and education ==
Johnston was born on 29 June 1930. He was educated at Wesley College, a Methodist private school in Dublin, Ireland. He studied at Trinity College, Dublin, and graduated with a Bachelor of Arts (BA) degree in 1955; as per tradition, his BA was promoted to a Master of Arts (MA Dubl) in 1969.

== Ordained ministry ==
Johnston was ordained in the Church of Ireland as a deacon in 1955 and as a priest in 1956. From 1955 to 1959, he served his curacy at St John's Church, Orangefield, County Down in the Diocese of Down and Dromore.

On 15 April 1959, Johnston was commissioned into the Royal Army Chaplains' Department (RAChD) as a Chaplain to the Forces 4th Class (equivalent in rank to captain). He was posted to British Army of the Rhine and served as chaplain of the Garrison Church in Hamelin in Germany from 1962 to 1964. From 1977 to 1980, he was Assistant Chaplain General of the South East District. From 1980 to 1986, he served as Chaplain-General to the Forces and was therefore head of the RAChD. As the most senior Anglican chaplain in the British Army, he also served as Archdeacon for the Army and therefore was granted the title The Venerable. During his military career, he saw service in the United Kingdom, Germany, Aden, and Cyprus. He left the British Army in 1987.

Rather than return to the Church of Ireland, Johnston remained in England and became a priest in the Church of England. From 1987 to 1991, he was Priest-in-Charge of St Laurence's Church, Winslow in the Diocese of Oxford. After his parish was merged with another, he served as Rector of the newly created benefice of Winslow with Great Horwood and Addington. He was also Rural Dean of Claydon between 1989 and 1994.

Johnston retired from full-time ministry in 1995. After that he lived in Devon and held Permission to Officiate in the Diocese of Exeter.

== Personal life and death ==
In 1963, Johnston married Jennifer Morton. Together, they have two sons and one daughter.

Frank Johnston died on 1 September 2023, at the age of 93.

== Honours ==
On 15 April 1980, Johnston was appointed an Honorary Chaplain to the Queen (QHC). In the 1983 New Year Honours, he was appointed a Companion of the Order of the Bath (CB).
