= Winslow War Memorial =

War Memorial in England

Coordinates: 51.942039°N 0.881570°W

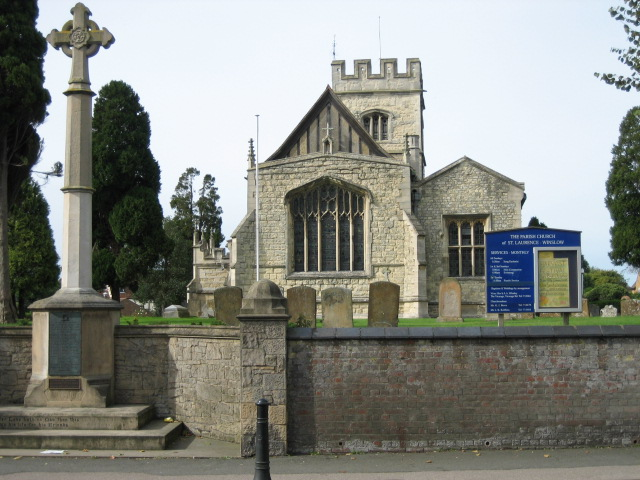
Winslow War Memorial and St Laurence Parish Church

Winslow War Memorial is located in High Street, Winslow, Buckinghamshire, England. It is a grade II listed building with Historic England and commemorates men who died in the First World War with later additions for the Second World War, Malayan Emergency and Falklands Conflict. It was unveiled in 1920.
