= Wingrave =

Village in Buckinghamshire, England

Coordinates: 51.8638°N 0.7387°W

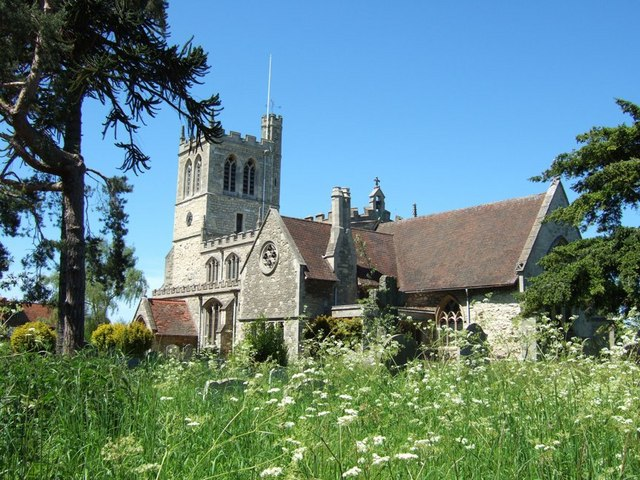
- SS Peter & Paul, Wingrave

- Location within Buckinghamshire
- Population: 1,512 (2011 Census)
- OS grid reference: SP858183
- Civil parish: Wingrave with Rowsham
- Unitary authority: Buckinghamshire
- Ceremonial county: Buckinghamshire
- Region: South East
- Country: England
- Sovereign state: United Kingdom
- Post town: AYLESBURY
- Postcode district: HP22
- Dialling code: 01296
- Police: Thames Valley
- Fire: Buckinghamshire
- Ambulance: South Central
- UK Parliament: Aylesbury

Wingrave is a village in Buckinghamshire, England, about four miles northeast of Aylesbury and three miles southwest of Wing.

The civil parish is called Wingrave with Rowsham within Buckinghamshire district and incorporates the hamlet of Rowsham.

Wingrave is twinned with La Bouëxière in France.

== Etymology ==
Its name occurs in the Domesday Book as Withungrave and in 1163 as Wiungraua. It comes from Old English Wiwinga grāf or Wēoinga grāf = "the grove of the people referred to by Wing, Buckinghamshire" or "the grove of the people of the heathen temple".

== Architecture ==
Around the recreation ground and in other parts of the village are many houses and cottages of varying sizes, constructed in Tudor Revival style, erected by Hannah de Rothschild in the 19th century. These houses, which display her personal cypher 'H de R' were homes for estate employees. They remained part of the Mentmore Estate until well into the 20th century and are very sought after today, commanding a very high price.

The old village school was also funded by Hannah De Rothschild and was opened by William Gladstone, the prime minister of the day. It remained as the village school until just before the Second World War, when it closed when a new larger school was built. It was then used as the village hall until 1976, when it was converted into two fantastic houses extremely sought after for its historic features and history.

=== Lordship of Burbage in the Parish of Wingrave Buckinghamshire ===
The Manor of Burbage lies within the Parish of Wingrave, Buckinghamshire. First referred to by name in or about 1465, by Sir Edmund Hampden and called Edmunds Manor. William Hampden was holding Burbage Manor (the first naming as such) at his death in 1525 and the Manor was then passed to his son John Hampden in 1533. The Manor is now, roughly in what is the major part of the Parish of Wingrave Buckinghamshire. The last active Lord of the Manor was Roland William Raven, OBE, FRCS, who on his death passed the estate to his wife Dame Kathleen Raven, the Manor was then passed into the hands of the Royal College of Surgeons. The estate eventually sold off all the land and tangible assets leaving the Title and the remaining Manorial Rights which eventually were passed on to the present holder. This is a Feudal Manorial Lordship, or Honour or Dignity, rather than a Peerage. The present holder of the Lordship is Anthony Mealing a Consultant Conservation Architect from High Wycombe in Buckinghamshire.

The Lord of the Manor of Burbage, from the 12th century until the outbreak of the Second World War, could require the holder (tenant or freeholder) of the Manor Farm to have the Parish Church Floor strewn with fresh cut grass on the first Sunday after St Peter's day (29 June). The Lord of the Manor can still call a Court Leet, which generally had a jury formed from the freehold tenants or freemen of the Manor. The jury's role was similar to that of the doomsmen of the Anglo-Saxon period and included electing the officers (other than the Steward who was appointed by the lord), to bring matters to the attention of the court and deciding on them.

Wingrave Manor (the building), also known as the 'Old Manor House', is a Victorian half timbered pastiche of nearby Ascott House. It was built in 1876 by Hannah de Rothschild, like many of the village's cottages. The Rothschild family do not appear to have ever lived at Wingrave, as the house was soon let to the Stewart-Freeman Family who enlarged it in 1885 and eventually purchased it in 1898.

== Czech connection ==
It was the last Stewart-Freeman daughter, Mary Eveline, Countess of Essex (divorced wife of the Earl of Essex), who leased Wingrave Manor, to the exiled Czechoslovak government. They leased it for £20 a week as a residence for the employees and families of the Private Office of President Beneš (called the Chancellery or the Cabinet). It was used as a safe house and a guest-house for people visiting President Beneš. Amongst the guests were Jan Masaryk and sometimes Winston Churchill. During this time the President Dr. Edvard Beneš lived at The Abbey in nearby Aston Abbotts, and the staff of his Military Intelligence of the exiled government lived at Addington House in nearby Addington, near Winslow. Meanwhile, the offices of the Czechoslovak government-in-exile were at various locations in London.

President Beneš donated a bus shelter to the villages of Aston Abbotts and Wingrave in 1944. This is on the A418 between the two villages. Following the departure of President Beneš's officials in 1945, the Manor was leased to an order of nuns who cared for disabled children on the site for over twenty-five years.

On 20 October 1998 President Václav Havel, the first post-communist President of the Czech Republic, visited Wingrave as part of his state visit, to mark its Czech connections. While there he visited the parish church, laid a wreath at the war memorial and donated a bench to the village green.

== Wingrave C of E Combined School ==
Wingrave C of E Combined school is the only primary school in the village, and takes children from Wingrave, Cublington, Rowsham and Aston Abbotts. The current site was built in 1974, after the old schools at Wingrave and Aston Abbotts closed. It teaches around 200 pupils from the ages of 4 to 11. Pupils attend the Parish Church for the annual harvest festival and on other occasions. At the age of 11, the pupils move to either Cottesloe School in Wing or a selective school in Aylesbury.

== MacIntyre School ==
In 1972 the Manor was sold to become MacIntyre School. MacIntyre school subsequently moved to a new purpose built premises in 2006 approximately 100 metres from the Manor House having sold off the manor house for development. The school cares for children described as having complex learning difficulties, many on the autism spectrum, and was supported by Bob Monkhouse during his lifetime. The school offers residential and day placements.

== Churches ==
Wingrave has a parish Church of St Peter and St Paul. Wingrave also has a Methodist church at Nup End. The former United Reformed Church closed in 2005, although the Congregational churchyard remains as a memorial garden.

== Notable people ==
Ian Dury lived in an old vicarage in Wingrave from the early 1970s. It is claimed his wife Betty gave birth to their second child, Baxter, here in 1971 whilst Ian and his band rehearsed in the front room.
