= Aylesbury College =

College in Buckinghamshire, England

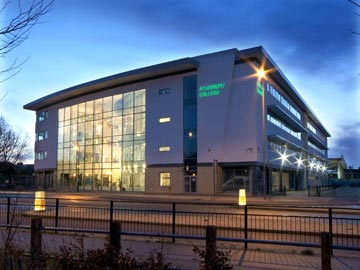
- Type: Further education college
- Established: 1962
- Principal: Jenny Craig
- Students: 3,000
- Location: Aylesbury, England; 51.8140°N 0.8229°W
- Website: http://www.buckscollegegroup.ac.uk/

Aylesbury College is a general further education college in Aylesbury, Buckinghamshire, England. It educates students in a broad range of vocational fields, including Creative Arts, Health and Social Care, Hair and Beauty, Hospitality and Catering, Construction, Business and IT in addition to A Level and GCSE in its Sixth Form Centre. In September 2021, a new qualification, which is known as T Level was introduced for the first time.

== Education ==
Although many learners are aged 16–18, the college offers a range of programmes for employers and employees, including Apprenticeships, Traineeships, and other work-based training. In 2011/12 the college enrolled approximately 1,812 students in full-time courses and 812 in part-time courses.

In May 2013 Aylesbury College received a rating of 'Good' from Ofsted following a full inspection.

== Facilities ==
In 2007 the college undertook significant change following a £30 million building project to provide a new modern learning environment.

The new build was designed to provide a "real world" feel to vocational learning including training kitchens, The Hardings Training Restaurant, a Commercial Hair Salon with beauty treatment rooms and reception, a sports hall with dance studio and gym, a photography studio, media and edit suite, engineering workshops, and an art learning centre.

== Higher education ==
Aylesbury College in partnership with local universities offers degree-level courses at its own higher education centre. Buckinghamshire New University is particularly close with the college and provides accreditation for most of the courses on offer.

As of 2016, the college is host to the Aylesbury Campus of the University of Bedfordshire, for students of Nursing (Adult and Mental Health) and Midwifery.

== Local links ==
Aylesbury College has ties with local secondary education establishments, Aylesbury Vale Academy, John Colet School, The Grange School and Cottesloe School.

In September 2013 Buckinghamshire University Technical College opened in a new building on the Aylesbury College campus. The university technical college is co-sponsored by Aylesbury College and Buckinghamshire New University.

== Merger into Buckinghamshire College Group ==
In October 2017, Aylesbury College was merged with Amersham and Wycombe College to form into Buckinghamshire College Group which continues to use this name today. As well as the Aylesbury Campus, there are also two separate campuses, one in Amersham and other in the Flackwell Heath area of High Wycombe.
