= Prestwood Local Nature Reserve =

Local nature reserve in Buckinghamshire, England

Coordinates: 51.684°N 0.74875°W

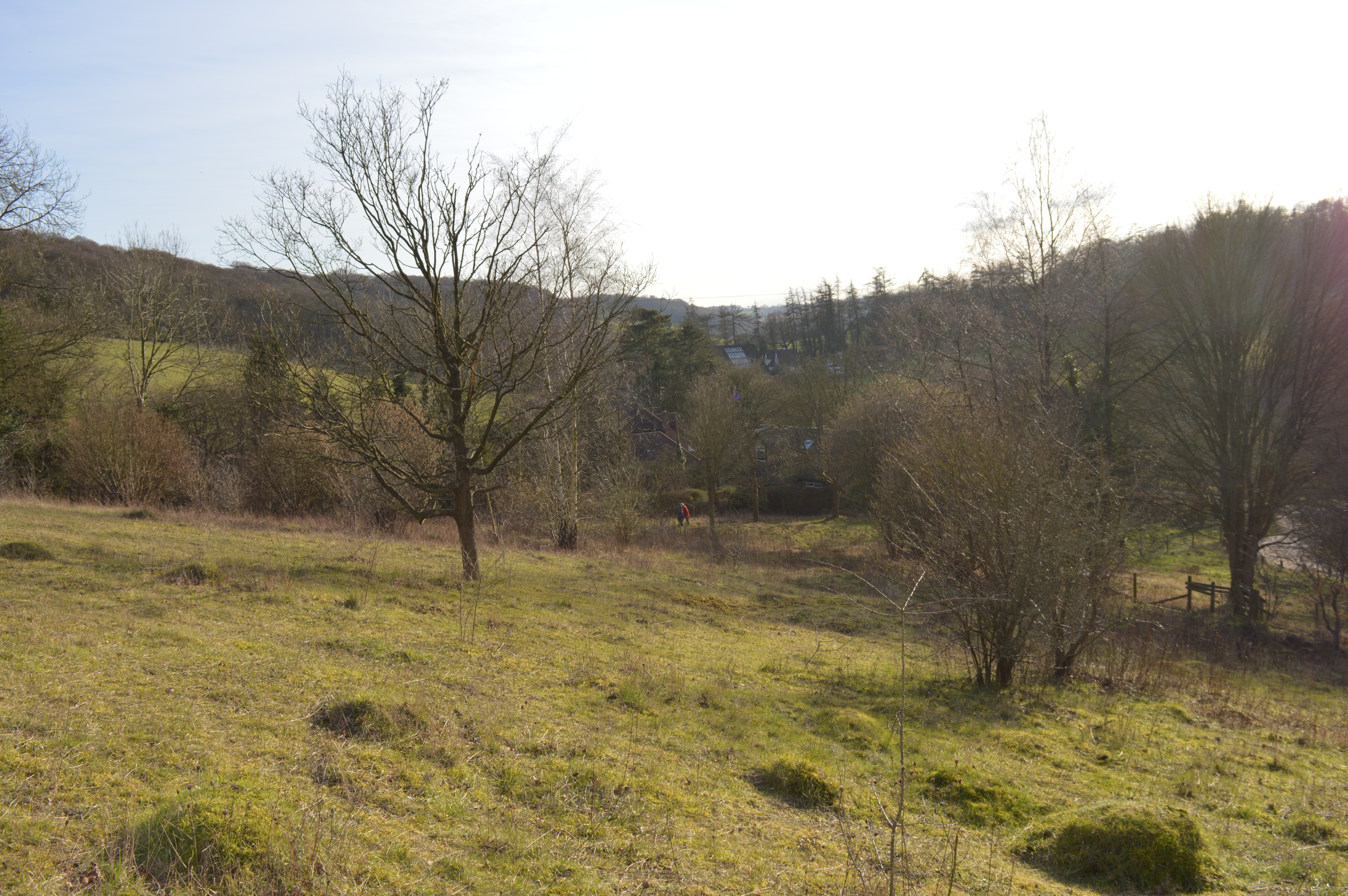

Prestwood Local Nature Reserve or Prestwood (Picnic Site) is a 2.1 hectares (5.2 acres) Local Nature Reserve in Prestwood in Buckinghamshire. It is in the Chilterns Area of Outstanding Natural Beauty. The site is owned by Wycombe District Council and leased to the Chiltern Society.

The site was a dump for motor vehicles until 1976, when it was acquired by Wycombe Council. The Chiltern Society took over the management in 2013. It is steeply sloping chalk grassland with a diverse range of species, including birds such bullfinches, blackcaps and garden warblers, are butterflies such as dingy, grizzled skippers and green hairstreaks.

There is a car park for the site and picnic tables off Hampden Road near Perks Lane.
