= Edlesborough =

Village in Buckinghamshire, England

Coordinates: 51.8653°N 0.5872°W

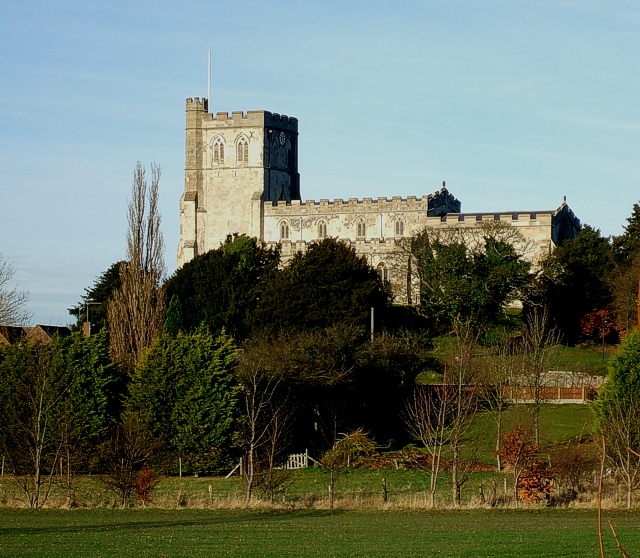
- St Mary the Virgin parish church

- Location within Buckinghamshire
- Population: 2,952
- Civil parish: Edlesborough
- Unitary authority: Buckinghamshire
- Ceremonial county: Buckinghamshire
- Region: South East
- Country: England
- Sovereign state: United Kingdom
- Post town: Dunstable
- Postcode district: LU6
- Dialling code: 01525
- Police: Thames Valley
- Fire: Buckinghamshire
- Ambulance: South Central
- UK Parliament: Aylesbury
- Website: Edlesborough Parish Council

Edlesborough is a village and civil parish in the Aylesbury Vale area of Buckinghamshire, England. Edlesborough is about 3 miles (5 km) west-south-west of Dunstable and immediately south of the village of Eaton Bray, just over the county boundary in Bedfordshire.

The parish dates back to Saxon times. Prior to the Norman conquest of 1066, it was held by the theign Ulf. After the conquest, it was held by Gilbert of Ghent as recorded in the 1086 Domesday Book. The Lower Icknield Way, a prehistoric track that runs below the Chiltern Escarpment, runs through the village and aligns with the church mound.

As well as the village of Edlesborough itself, the civil parish also includes the hamlets of Dagnall, Northall and part of Ringshall. Hudnall was transferred in 1885 to the parish of Little Gaddesden in Hertfordshire.

== Toponym ==
The village toponym is derived from the Old English for "Eadwulf's barrow". The Domesday Book of 1086 records it as "Eddinberge"; and records from 1413 list it as "Edlisburgh".

== Economic and social history ==
At the time of the Domesday Book (1086) there were two mills in Edlesborough. The local economy was traditionally agricultural, raising crops of barley, wheat and beans.

The village was once a centre for the straw plait industry.

== 20th-century history ==
RAF Edlesborough was a radio station near Dagnall, acting as a transmitter site for RAF Stanbridge.

The nearby Edlesborough Hill is a low wooded hill beside the River Ouzel just south of the village. For decades it was the site of a Classic trials motor sport event known as the March Hare in which a variety of vehicles tried to climb the hill's steep ascent as a test of their capabilities.

== Parish church ==
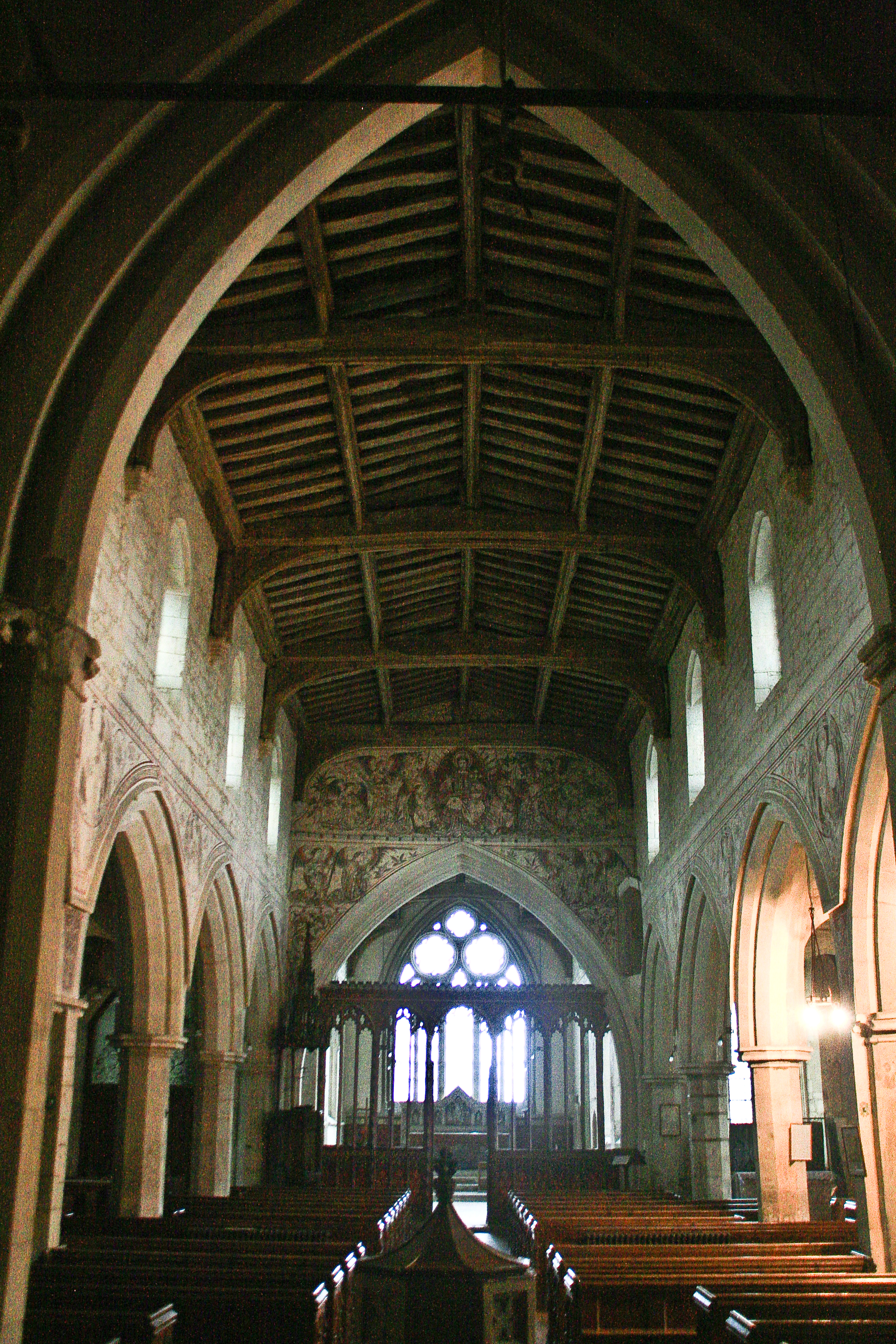
The wall paintings in the nave of St Mary's Church

The Church of England parish church of St Mary the Virgin is built on top of a barrow and its high 14th-century bell tower is a local landmark. The church has been redundant since 1975, when the ecclesiastical parish merged with that of Eaton Bray. Today the church is in the care of the Churches Conservation Trust, and it is normally open to visitors.

The earliest parts of the church date from the 13th century. A chantry was added in 1338 and the tower in 1340. The closeness of these construction dates indicates how rich Edlesborough parish was at the time. Much of the church was altered in the 15th century, including the chantry, which has given the church a very 15th-century character.

Thomas Cobhambury appears as vicar of Edlisburgh in 1413.

On 28 March 1824, the tower was struck by lightning, setting it on fire. The roof's lead melted, and the molten lead set fire to everything it struck. Villagers fought the fire, which burned for 12 hours until it was extinguished.

=== Furnishings ===
The 15th-century rood screen, pulpit with tester and timber roofs are all notable. In the 15th century six misericords were added to the choir stalls. These include carvings of a bat, a dragon and a mermaid. The misericord of the dragon also has some frog carvings for its supporters. There are some notable monumental brasses. The church underwent two major restorations overseen by the architect Robert Jewell Withers in 1867 and 1875. In the first restoration, box pews were replaced with pine benches, a gallery was removed from the west, the rood screen was painted, and a large wall painting was added to the nave wall by the Arts and Crafts artist Daniel Bell, depicting Christ enthroned in Majesty. The 1875 restoration of the chancel was funded by a donation from Adelbert Brownlow-Cust, 3rd Earl Brownlow of Ashridge.

A more modern addition is a two-light stained glass window on the theme of the Nativity by M. E. Aldrich Rope, also in an Arts and Crafts style.

The Church contains six tuned bells, and one calling bell. It previously had only 5 tuned bells and one calling bell, however, another tuned bell was added after the fire in 1824. Since the Church was decommissioned, the bells no longer ring often; however, they are occasionally used for special events.

=== EdleFest ===
EdleFest, an annual live music festival, is hosted within the Church every summer. Alongside the music, drinks and cakes are also on offer to guests. All proceeds from the event go towards the continued upkeep of the building.

== Amenities ==
Edlesborough Primary Academy (Formerly Edlesborough School) is a community primary school. It serves the 4–11 age range and has about 250 pupils. The school was founded in 1849. The nearest secondary school is The Cottesloe School in Wing, though students that pass the Eleven-Plus exams can enrol in one of the three Grammar Schools in the relatively nearby town of Aylesbury; these being Aylesbury Grammar School, Aylesbury High School, and Sir Henry Floyd Grammar School.

The village green has two football pitches, one enclosed tennis court and a cricket square. There is a small playing area for children in the green, as well as another in The Grange, which is a residential development further out in the village. There is also a sports pavilion next to the tennis court, which was upgraded in 2021 to include a gym and a café. Nearby, the more central area of the village contains the Edlesborough Post Office and Stores, a corner shop offering general food supplies and birthday cards, as well as functioning as the local post office. 2025 saw the additional opening of a Tesco Express within the village.

The Traveller's Rest, which sits between Edlesborough and Dagnall, serves as the village's local pub.

== St. Mary's Village Carnival ==
Annually, on the first Saturday in July, Edlesborough and the surrounding communities host a carnival on the Village Green. It features several attractions, starting with a float parade in which several parties compete for a rosette. These parties include the local Scout group, Edlesborough Primary Academy, as well as scout groups and schools from the surrounding villages. Other attractions include fairground rides, various shops, a classic vehicle display, barbeques and other food stalls, various performances by local performance groups, a dog show, and an owl display.

The carnival began as a traditional Church fete, hosted in the Vicarage garden, before being moved to Park Farm in Eaton Bray in 1965. In 1988, it was moved once again to Eaton Bray Recreational Ground, however, the next year, it was moved to the Edlesborough Village Green. It was originally set to alternate between Eaton Bray Recreational Ground and Edlesborough Village Green, however, the former soon became too small to accommodate the growing event, and it now remains in Edlesborough.

Each year, the carnival chooses a different theme, and that theme is often reflected in the float parade.

2000: Around The World
2001: Wild West
2002: Celebrating Britain
2003: Circus
2004: Fantasy
2005: Nursery Rhymes
2006: Films
2007: Favourite Adverts
2008: Fairy Tales
2009: Books
2010: Inventions
2011: Pirates
2012: Kings and Queens
2013: Sci-Fi
2014: Music
2015: The Sea
2016: Myths, Monsters and Magic
2017: Transport
2018: Games
2019: Village Life
2020 (Cancelled): Heroes
2021: Heroes
2022: Love Our Planet
2023: Children's Films
2024: World of Sport
2025: Our Countryside

=== Carnival trivia ===
- Pam Rhodes opened the 1998 carnival.
- In 2020, during the COVID-19 lockdown, a scarecrow competition was held instead of a carnival, where people made scarecrows and put them on display around the village.
- In 2021, the carnival, while not cancelled, was delayed, instead taking place on 28 August.

== Local myths and legends ==
- A legend says that a tunnel leads from the church into a former pub, then known as The Bell when it was running. The pub has since been transformed into a private residence.
- While the aforementioned pub "The Bell" was still running, some witnesses claim that after hours, the ghost of a girl with a besom broom could be seen sweeping leaves from the floor by the fireplace. The first report of this sighting claimed that the apparition asked for a better broom.
- Pine Road in the village is said to be the most haunted in the local area, with a ghost known as "The Mulk" making regular appearances on nights with a full moon. Residents have reported seeing a tall, ghostly figure accompanied by a brown and white dog running up and down the road.
- It is said that, on dark nights, riding on horseback down the road leading from the Church towards Tring Road, is the ghost of Dick Turpin. He was said to hide in the attic of Butler's Manor in Northall, looking out for coaches to come past for him to hold up.

== Popular culture ==
The English band Talk Talk filmed a music video for their song "Dum Dum Girl" on their 1984 album It's My Life. The video was filmed on Sparrow Hill Farm; the parish church can be seen in the background. The video was released on the band's 1990 video compilation "Natural History: The Very Best Of Talk Talk".

== Sources ==
- Gróf, László (1988). Children of Straw -– The story of a Vanished Craft and Industry in Bucks, Herts, Beds and Essex. Southampton: Barracuda Books. ISBN 0-86023-290-5.
- Page, W.H., ed. (1925). A History of the County of Buckingham, Volume 3. Victoria County History. pp. 350–361.
- Pevsner, Nikolaus (1960). Buckinghamshire. The Buildings of England. Harmondsworth: Penguin Books. pp. 114–115. ISBN 0-14-071019-1.
