= Quarrendon Estate =

Housing estate in Aylesbury, Buckinghamshire, England

Coordinates: 51.826253°N 0.828615°W

Quarrendon
- Location within Buckinghamshire
- Population: 5,478 (2011 Census)
- OS grid reference: SP8014
- Civil parish: Aylesbury
- Unitary authority: Buckinghamshire
- Ceremonial county: Buckinghamshire
- Region: South East
- Country: England
- Sovereign state: United Kingdom
- Post town: AYLESBURY
- Postcode district: HP19
- Dialling code: 01296
- Police: Thames Valley
- Fire: Buckinghamshire
- Ambulance: South Central
- UK Parliament: Aylesbury

Quarrendon is a large housing estate on the north west side of Aylesbury (where the 2011 census population was included) in Buckinghamshire, England. The estate is named after the nearby ancient village of Quarrendon.

== History ==
The estate was started in the post war years and added to in four main stages right through to the 1980s. It is now one of the largest housing estates in the modern town of Aylesbury with a population in the 2001 census of 5,897 people In the 2011 census, the estate had a population of 5,478 people.

== Facilities ==
=== Schools ===
- St Michaels Catholic School Aylesbury
- Aylesbury Vale Academy, formerly Quarrendon School

The estate has three community primary schools:

- Haydon Abbey School, with 380 pupils
- Thomas Hickman School, with 454 pupils.
- the Abbey Centre, the Pupil Referral Unit for Aylesbury.
