= Rowsham =

Hamlet in Buckinghamshire, England

Coordinates: 51.854°N 0.767°W

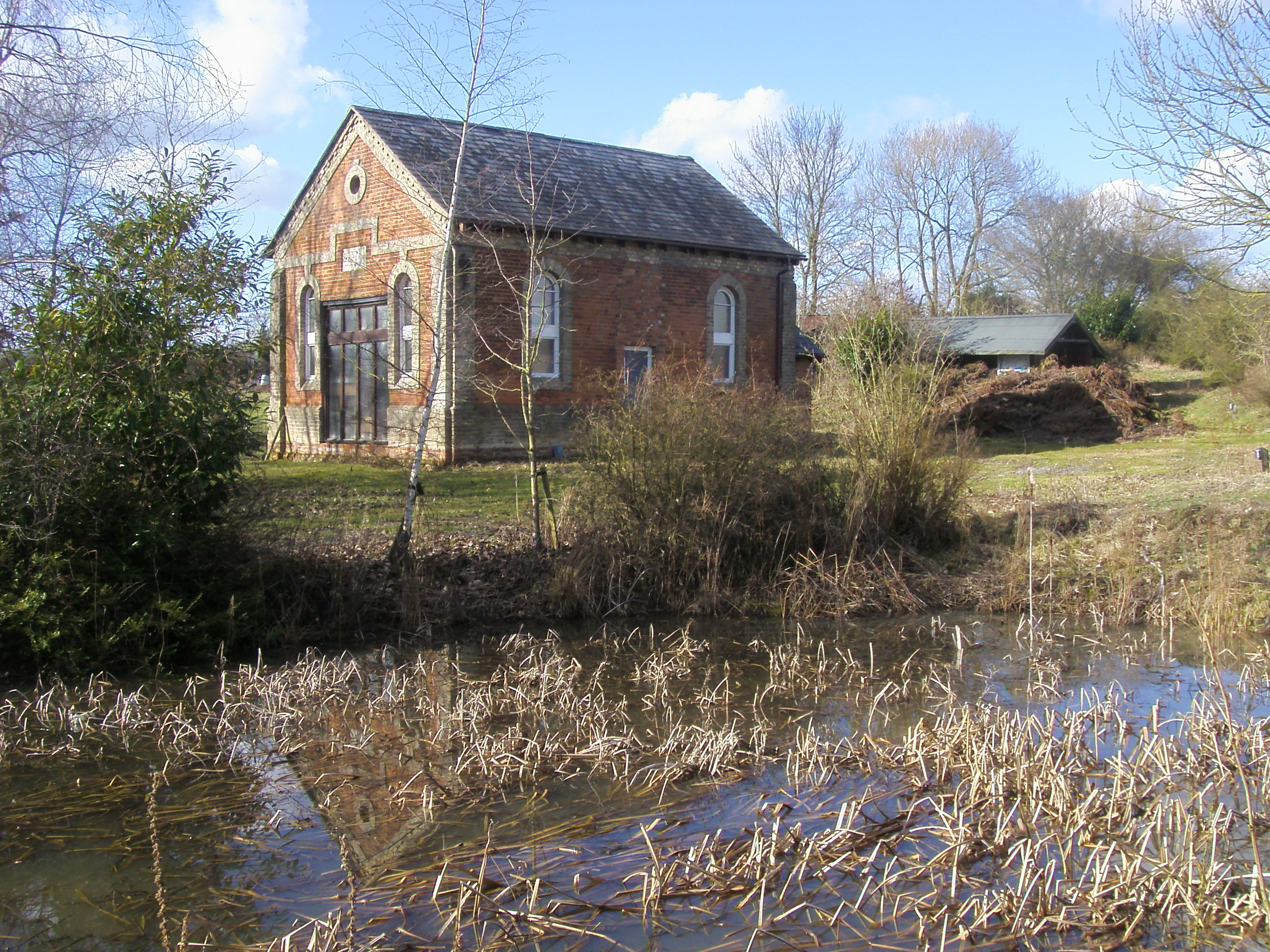
- Former Independent chapel in Brewhouse Lane

- Location within Buckinghamshire
- Civil parish: Wingrave
- Unitary authority: Buckinghamshire
- Ceremonial county: Buckinghamshire
- Region: South East
- Country: England
- Sovereign state: United Kingdom
- Post town: Aylesbury
- Postcode district: HP22
- Dialling code: 01296
- Police: Thames Valley
- Fire: Buckinghamshire
- Ambulance: South Central
- UK Parliament: Aylesbury

Rowsham is a hamlet in the parish of Wingrave with Rowsham in Buckinghamshire, England. It is south of the village of Wingrave on the A418 road, which links Bierton with Wing.

Rowsham's name is derived from Old English, meaning "Hrothwulf's home". In manorial rolls of 1198 it was recorded as Rollesham.

An Independent Chapel was built in Rowsham in 1870 which is still in standing but no longer used for worship.
