= Holy Trinity Church, Prestwood =

Church in Prestwood, Buckinghamshire, England

Coordinates: 51.689°N 0.737°W

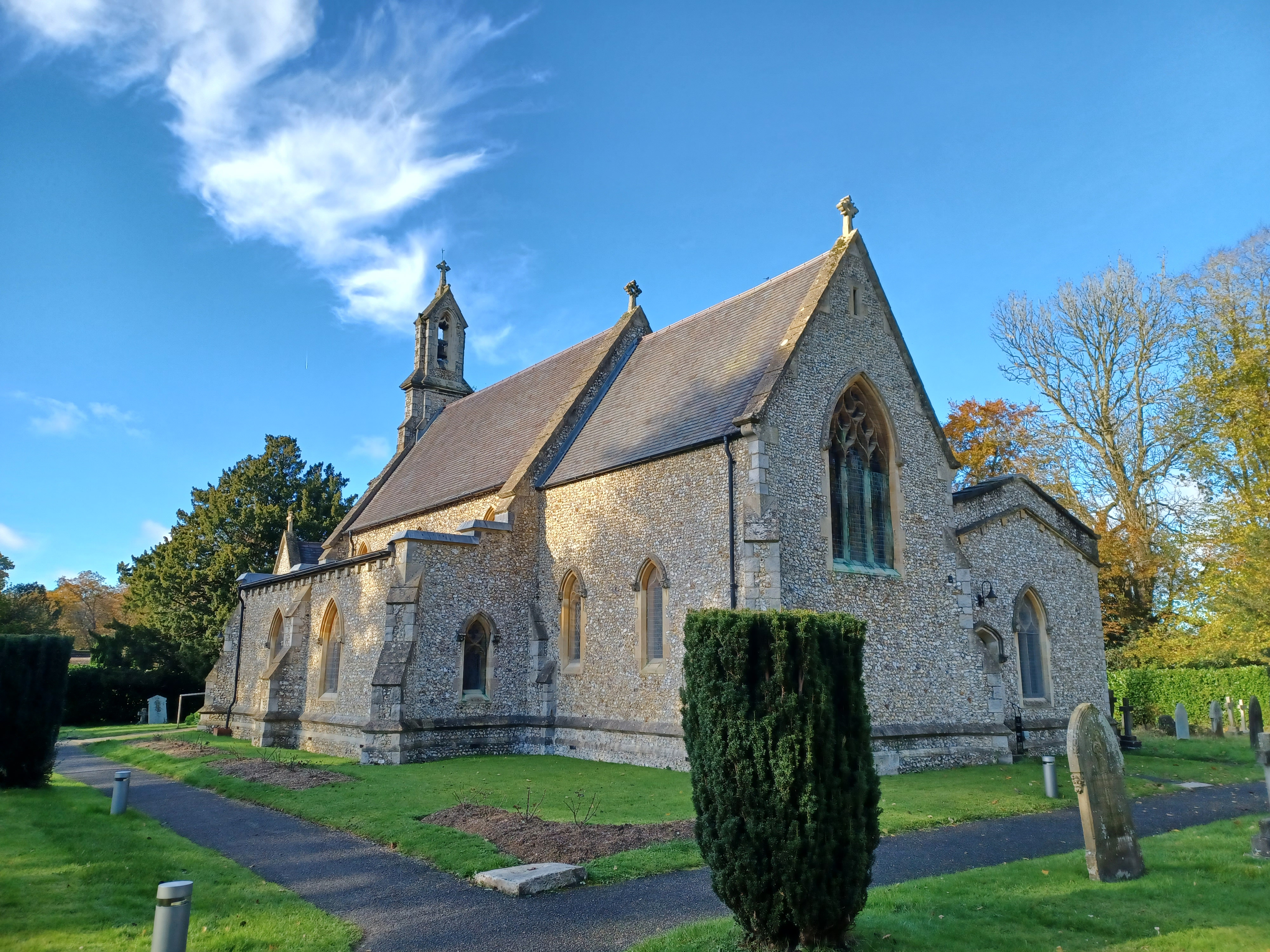
Holy Trinity Church, Prestwood

Holy Trinity Church, Prestwood is the Church of England church serving the Buckinghamshire village and parish of Prestwood. The church, its lych gate and the church school, and Church Cottage at 134 Wycombe Road are listed, as well as Prestwood Park House behind the church.

== Origins of parish and church ==
Up until 1852, Prestwood fell largely into the parish of Hughenden. Hughenden's vicar from 1836 to 1851 was John Robert Pigott; concerned that his parish was too large to meet the spiritual needs of all its inhabitants, he began fundraising for a new church building to serve Prestwood, along with a school, schoolmaster's house, and an endowment for the living of the new parish's vicar at a public meeting in Aylesbury on 15 April 1846. The biggest contributor was the Reverend Thomas Evetts, who in 1848 was appointed to the Prestwood church project by the local bishop, and eventually contributed over £3000. The church building itself was erected on land purchased from Knives Farm. Construction was delayed by a decision to make the nave pillars out of chalk, which proved entirely impractical; they were replaced with pillars of Bath Stone. Moreover, a contractor went bankrupt in May 1849. The church was consecrated 19 October 1849 and cost £1400. The parish was created on 5 April 1852 from land in the parishes of Hughenden and Great Missenden. Following Evetts, vicars included J. W. W. Booth (1892-1902) and H. Fallows (1939-51), and churchwardens included H. R. Clark (1940–68).

== Architecture ==
=== Overview ===
The church was designed by Edward Buckton Lamb, broadly in the late Decorated style of the Gothic Revival, and influenced by Tractarian theology. The material was local flint and mortar and Denner Hill sandstone, with Bath Stone dressings. Lamb's original designs drew some criticism (particularly the unusual feature of a chancel at both the east and west ends) and were quite extensively reworked. The nave of the realised church is 32 feet long and 15½ wide with a high, narrow, triple-chamfered chancel arch at each end. The nave arcades have three arches: two eleven feet wide, and squat, and a third, by the chancel, a mere three feet wide; they sit on octagonal pillars six feet high. The narrowest arches give access from the chancel to the stone pulpit. There is a clerestory characterised by stained glass windows, at least some of which were designed by Lamb and which serve more for decoration than to admit light. Over the west gable of the nave there is a bell-cote rising to 50 feet and containing a single bell founded in 1849. Pews extend from the nave into the aisles; in the original plan of the church, these could seat up to 246 people. The roof-tiles were mounted on wooden battens which originally formed the church ceiling, while heating was provided by three stoves. Rainwater from the roof was piped into a tank near the original vicarage to provide water.

Concluding that the design of the building was grander than its proportions really warranted, D. J. Keen opined that 'it might be said that the building was never intended to be filled with life-sized people at all'.

=== Alterations ===
1884 saw some significant alterations to the chancel by the Reverend H. M. Wells, at his own expense, raising the low roofline five feet, almost as high as the nave, replacing the low, ornately carved ceiling with a barrel roof of seven cants with carved Tudor rose bosses. Wells's wife gave the church a mosaic reredos, while his daughters donated two large wrought iron and brass candelabras. In 1891 the parish bought a new organ, installing it in the place of one of the choir stalls. For the church's golden jubilee in 1899, the organist (and headmaster of the church school) W. H. Pitt carved a gothic frame for the reredos and hanging oil lamps were introduced. Central heating was added in 1905. The cramped pews were replaced in 1920, reducing the seating capacity to 181. The oil lamps were replaced with electric lighting in 1930. The original nave ceiling was covered first in matchboarding and, in the twentieth century, plaster.

In 1961-62 major restorations were conducted, principally focusing on replacing most of the roofing and the central heating system.

== Gallery ==
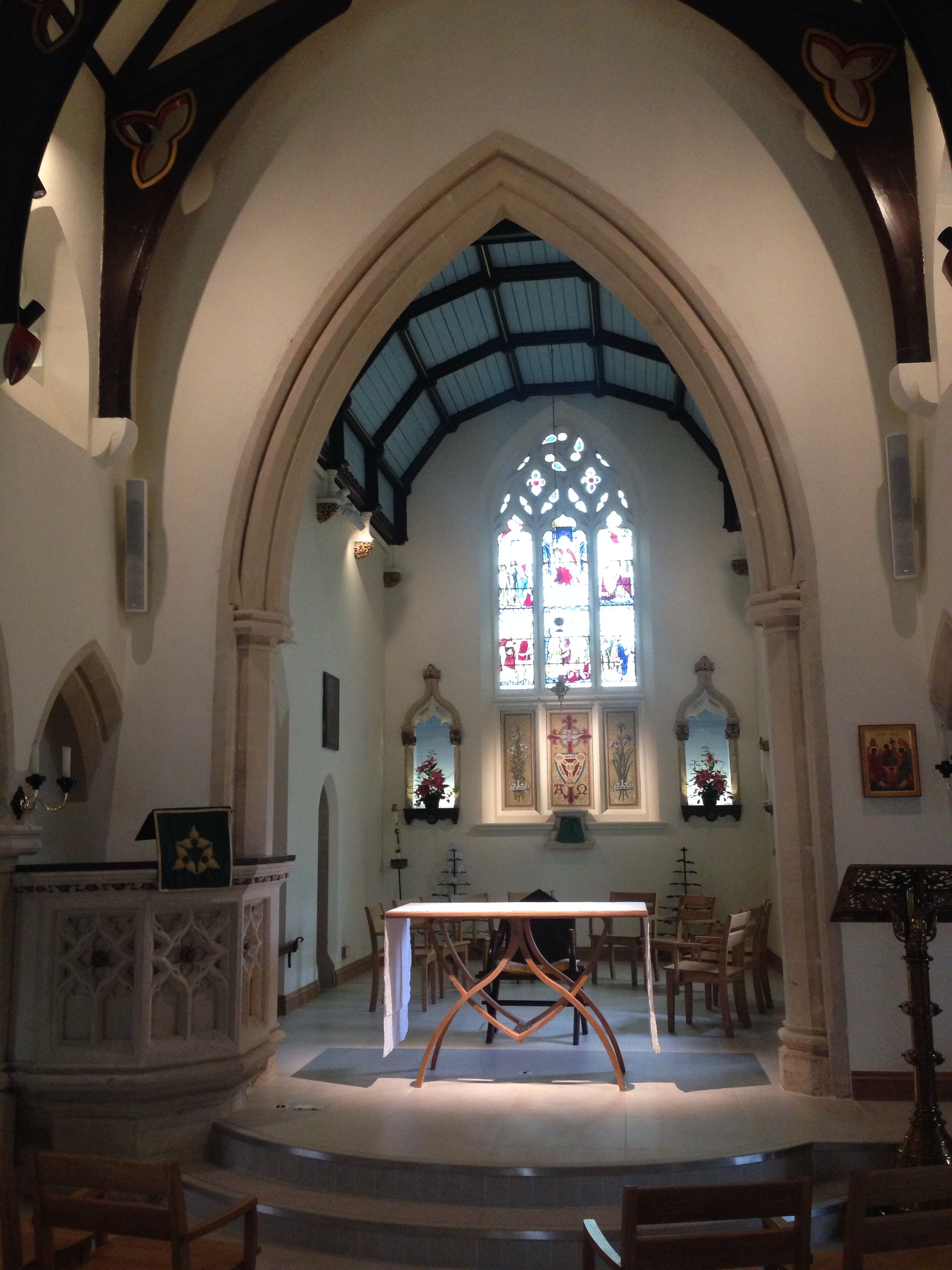
Altar and chancel, seen from the nave

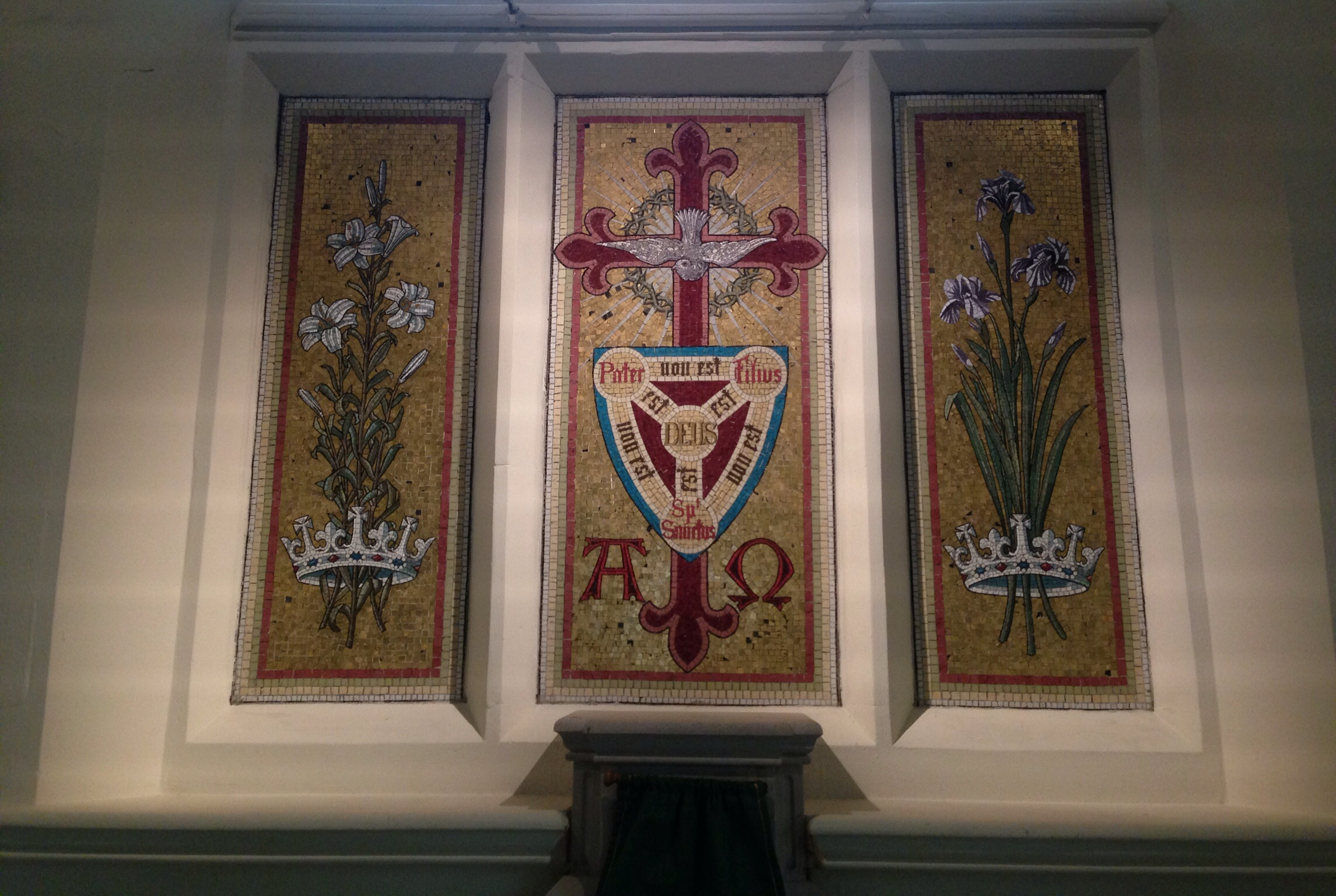
Mosaic reredos, gifted by the wife of Reverend H. M. Wells.

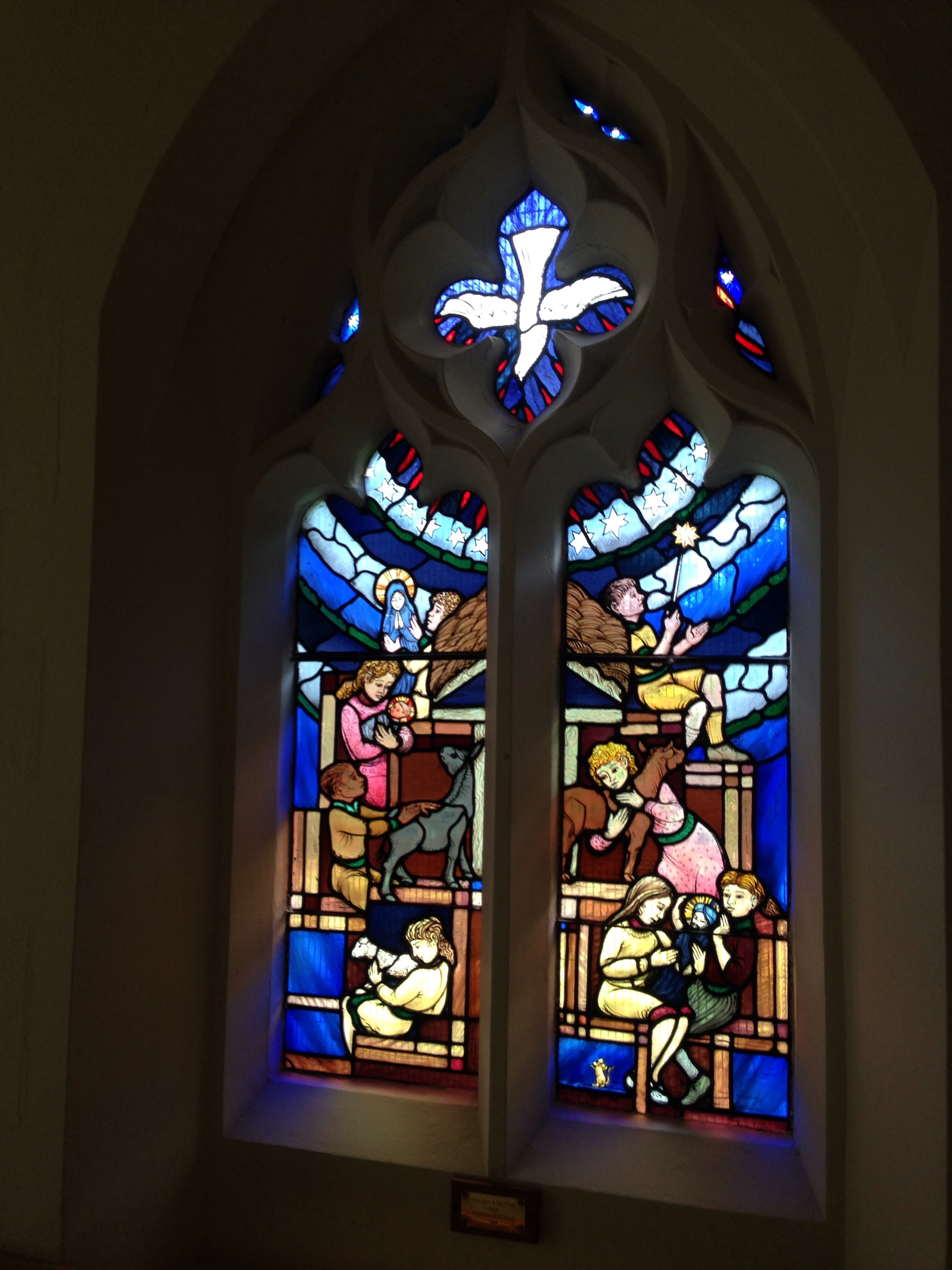
Stained glass window

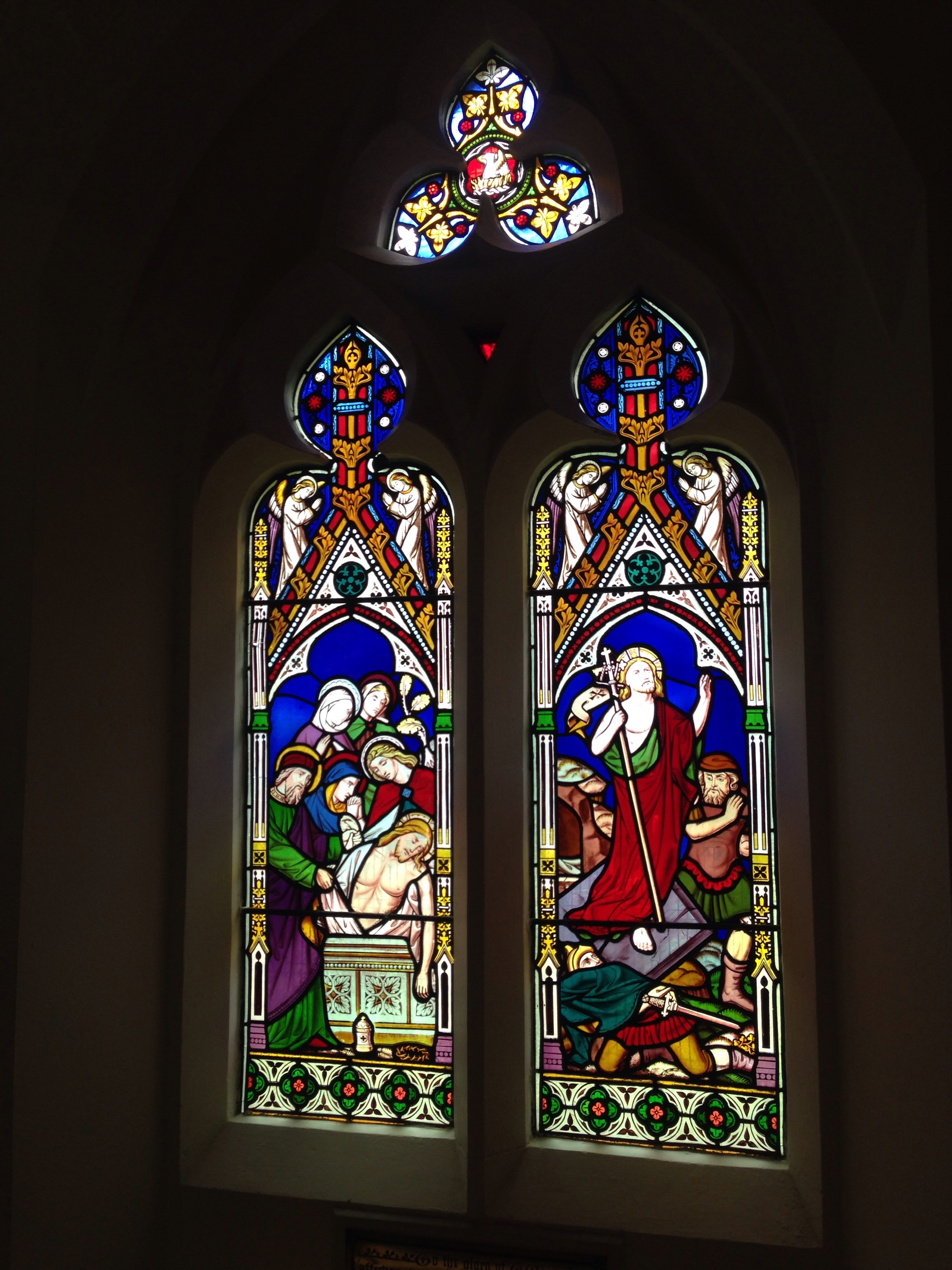
