= Aylesbury Vale Academy =

The Aylesbury Vale Academy

Location
- Paradise Orchard, Berryfields; Aylesbury, Buckinghamshire, HP18 0WS; England; 51.8268°N 0.8228°W

Information
- Type: Academy
- Motto: Respect | Aspiration | Resilience
- Religious affiliation: Church of England
- Established: 2009
- Local authority: Buckinghamshire
- Department for Education URN: 135879 Tables
- Ofsted: Reports
- Principal: Gavin Gibson
- Gender: Mixed
- Age: 3 to 19
- Enrolment: 1428
- Colleges: Faraday; Franklin; Nobel
- Website: http://www.theacademy.me/

The Aylesbury Vale Academy, formerly Quarrendon School, was Buckinghamshire's first academy. It is a Church of England academy with the Anglican Diocese of Oxford as the primary sponsor and Buckinghamshire Council as a co-sponsor.

The academy's catchment area comprises parts of north Aylesbury, including Quarrendon, Elmhurst and Watermead, as well as the villages of Hardwick, Weedon, Whitchurch, Oving and Pitchcott. It also includes both the Berryfields and Weedon Hill developments.

== History ==
Quarrendon County Secondary School was officially opened by Prince Philip, Duke of Edinburgh. on 13 June 1958. It was later known as Quarrendon Upper School and finally as Quarrendon School. Quarrendon School officially closed on 10 July 2009.

Quarrendon School was placed on special measures, for the second time in five years, in September 2004. The school came out of special measures in November 2006, after making satisfactory progress. In 2007, the school was planning to apply to become a specialist school in science and technology.

The school's sixth form reopened in September 2008.

Buckinghamshire County Council originally planned to close the school in 2009, and to move to a new site, built as part of the Berryfields major development area, with housing replacing the school on the current site. However, in 2006, there was some doubt as to whether this would happen due to funding issues.

In 2007, it was proposed that Quarrendon would become a church academy, jointly funded and controlled by the local authority and the Church of England. It was also proposed that Brunel University, would become a partner.

The proposal was accepted in November 2008. Quarrendon became the Aylesbury Vale Academy in 2009 and had £1.5 million invested in it over the next few years. Pupils and staff at the school automatically transferred to the new academy. The academy staff and students transferred to the new building in September 2013.

The school later opened a primary department.

== Site ==
The Quarrendon site was made up of a series of blocks.

- Science block, built in 1971, with humanities on the first floor and the school library
- English block, opened in 1975, also contains the sports hall, dance and performing arts studios and special educational needs (SEN) study centre
- Administration block with gymnasium, assembly hall, canteen, main reception and headteachers office
- Tower block for modern foreign languages, mathematics, business studies and ICT
- Technology block
- Music block

Most of which have now been demolished after the academy moved to Berryfields.

The new building in Berryfields consists of one building for the academy and one for the Berryfields primary school next to it.

== Links with other schools and colleges ==
The Aylesbury Vale Academy has close links with Mandeville Upper School in Aylesbury as part of the Aylesbury School Sports Partnership. The academy is also a member of the Aylesbury Vale Leading Edge Partnership which includes the Grange School and Waddesdon Church of England School.

The academy also has close links with Aylesbury College, and sends students there weekly.

The academy also maintains links with its feeder primary schools and hosts an annual primary schools sports day.

== Notable alumni ==
- Emmerson Boyce, footballer
- Jennifer Gadirova and Jessica Gadirova Olympic medalist gymnasts
