= St Laurence's Church, Winslow =

Church in Buckinghamshire, England

- Parish Church of St Laurence
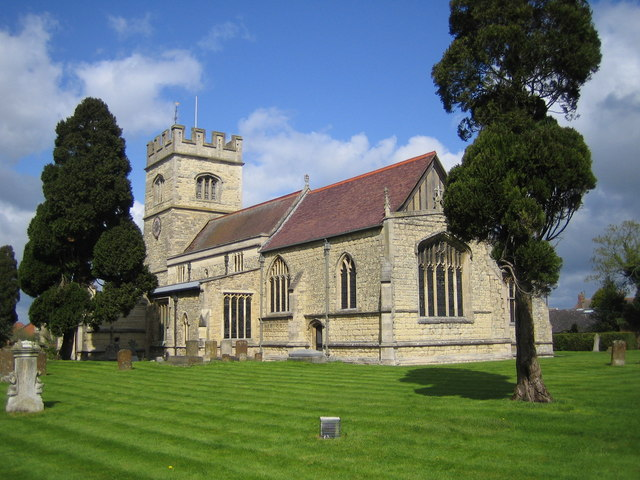
- St Laurence's Church, Winslow
- 51.942069°N 0.882236°W
- Location: High Street, Winslow, Buckinghamshire, MK18 3AB
- Country: England
- Denomination: Church of England

History
- Status: Active

Architecture
- Functional status: Parish church
- Heritage designation: Grade II*

Administration
- Diocese: Diocese of Oxford
- Archdeaconry: Archdeaconry of Buckingham
- Deanery: Claydon
- Parish: Winslow

Clergy
- Rector: The Revd Andrew Lightbown

St Laurence's Church is a Church of England parish church in Winslow, Buckinghamshire. It is a grade II* listed building.

== History ==
The earliest parts of the church dates to the 14th century. It was altered and extended in the late 15th century. It was restored from 1884 to 1889.

On 19 August 1959, the church was designated a grade II* listed building.

=== Present day ===
St Laurence's Church is part of the Benefice of Winslow with Great Horwood and Addington in the Archdeaconry of Buckingham of the Diocese of Oxford. The church is a corporate member of the Prayer Book Society.

== Notable people ==
- Jamie Allen, first Dean of Taranaki Cathedral, was an honorary curate from 2003 to 2005
- Frank Johnston, formerly Chaplain-General to the Forces, served as priest-in-charge from 1987 to 1991 and rector from 1991 to 1995.

== See also ==
- Winslow War Memorial
