= Sir Thomas Fremantle School =

Secondary free school in England

Coordinates: 51°56′45.9″N 0°53′5.0″W

Location
- Buckingham Road; Winslow, Buckinghamshire; England

Information
- Type: Free school
- Established: 2013
- Department for Education URN: 139663 Tables
- Ofsted: Reports
- Headmaster: F. Murphy
- Gender: Coeducational
- Age: 11 to 19
- Houses: Brunel; Christie; Mercury; Seacole; Peake; Boudicca
- Colour: Blue
- Website: http://www.sirthomasfremantle.org

Sir Thomas Fremantle School is a secondary free school that opened in Winslow, Buckinghamshire in September 2013. It was proposed by a group of local parents and educationalists to improve the quality and choice of available secondary education in North Buckinghamshire. The school opened in the former Winslow Centre, previously the site of Winslow Secondary Modern School. The school moved into a large purpose-built site off Buckingham Road in 2017.

The school is a non-denominational, fully comprehensive school for students between 11 and 19. The school is named after Sir Thomas Fremantle, a naval officer in the time of and a good friend of Lord Nelson

Originally, the school was divided into three houses, each bearing the name of a ship Sir Thomas Fremantle captained: Neptune, Hussar and Spitfire.

In 2021, the house names were updated based on a student election in the year combined with the fact that the school was changing the form system from vertical to horizontal. The new houses are named after: Isambard Kingdom Brunel, Agatha Chrisitie, Freddie Mercury and Mary Seacole. In 2022, as the school expanded, two additional houses were added named after Tim Peake and Boudicca.

In 2015, the school was judged as 'Good' with 'Outstanding' features by Ofsted, and this rating was reaffirmed in 2018.

Since September 2022, the Headmaster is Francis Murphy who replaced Neale Pledger.
