= Dagnall =

Village in Buckinghamshire, England

Coordinates: 51.836°N 0.560°W

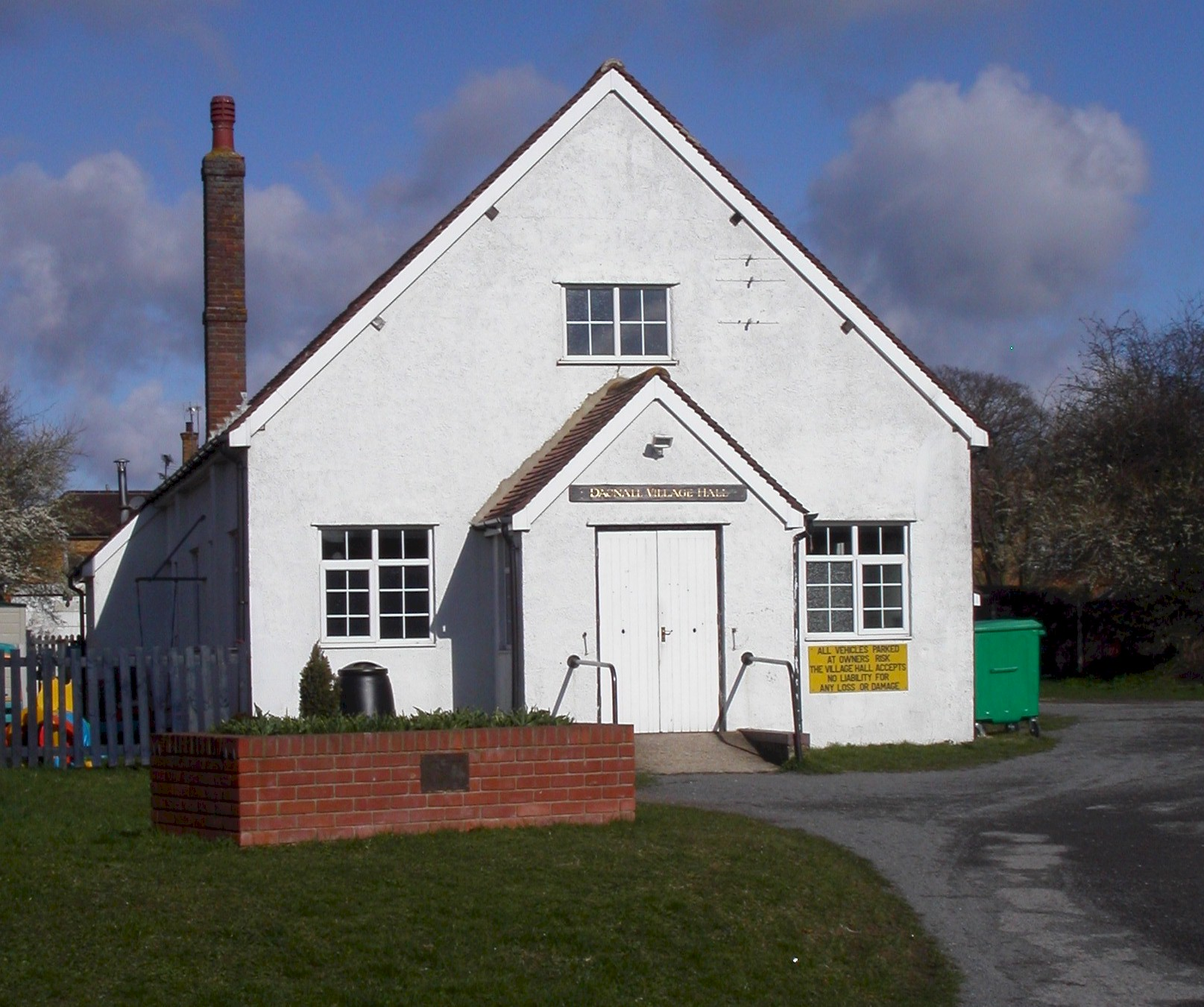
- Dagnall Village Hall

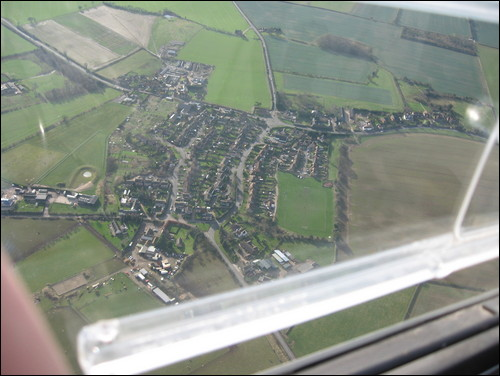
- Aerial view of Dagnall village

- Location within Buckinghamshire
- Population: 511
- OS grid reference: SP9965
- Civil parish: Edlesborough
- Unitary authority: Buckinghamshire
- Ceremonial county: Buckinghamshire
- Region: South East
- Country: England
- Sovereign state: United Kingdom
- Post town: Berkhamsted
- Postcode district: HP4
- Dialling code: 01442
- Police: Thames Valley
- Fire: Buckinghamshire
- Ambulance: South Central
- UK Parliament: Aylesbury
- Website: Edlesborough Parish Council

Dagnall is a village in the parish of Edlesborough, in Buckinghamshire, England.

The place name is derived from the Old English for "Daegga's Knoll". In manorial rolls of 1196 it was listed as Dagenhale. The spelling Dagenhale appears in a legal record of 1450. Thomas Bradwater is listed as a husbandman of the place.

Dagnall is in the Chiltern Hills and in the Chilterns Area of Outstanding Natural Beauty. It is next to the Ashridge Estate, owned and managed by The National Trust.

== Location ==
Four main roads link Dagnall with the nearby towns of Dunstable, Leighton Buzzard, Tring, Hemel Hempstead and Berkhamsted, and slightly further on to the larger towns of Luton, Aylesbury and Milton Keynes. The nearest villages to Dagnall are Ashridge, Studham and Whipsnade. Whipsnade Zoo is on the hill above the village.

The tripoint of Buckinghamshire, Bedfordshire and Hertfordshire is immediately to the south of Dagnall.

== Parish church ==
All Saints' parish church is a Church of England and Methodist local ecumenical partnership and has clergy from both denominations.

== Dagnall C of E School ==
Dagnall Church of England School is a mixed, community church primary school, which has capacity for 105 pupils and today educates children from the ages of three to eleven. Dagnall School, as it was then called, opened in 1909. In 1989 the number of registered pupils at Dagnall County First School, as it was then called, had fallen to just 13 and the school was at risk of closure. This risk came partly from the Education Reform Act 1988 which would introduce a National Curriculum that the school might not have been able to meet. A dedicated campaign saved the school by 1990. The school became a voluntary aided church school, under the Diocese of St Albans, in 2016, and changed its name to Dagnall VA C of E School.

== Local amenities ==
Amenities include one public house and two local farm shops. A further gastro pub is located just north of the village boundary. School buses are provided for children that go to Edlesborough School and Secondary Schools such as The Cottesloe School in Wing. The village falls within the catchment area of the long-established Aylesbury Grammar School. There are also private schools nearby.

The nearest main line railway stations are at Tring and Berkhamsted.

The nearest international airport London Luton Airport is a 25 minute drive away – Heathrow can be reached within 45 minutes.

There are many entertainment venues and restaurants close by in Tring, Berkhamsted and Hemel Hempstead, with popular theatres in both Berkhamsted and Tring, with larger theatres in Watford and Milton Keynes. The art deco Rex Cinema can also be found in Berkhamsted.

The village is located in an area of outstanding natural beauty, adjoining Ashridge Forest to the west and close to Whipsnade Zoo to its east flank. The Grand Union canal is also not far away.

The ancient Icknield Way Path passes through the village on its 110-mile journey from Ivinghoe Beacon in Buckinghamshire to Knettishall Heath in Suffolk. The Icknield Way Trail, a multi-user route for walkers, horse riders and off-road cyclists also passes close to the village. The village is also on a popular route for road cyclists of all levels.

== Notable residents ==
Tim Sherwood, a former professional footballer, lives on the edge of the village. He played for Watford, Norwich City, Blackburn Rovers, Tottenham Hotspur, Portsmouth and Coventry City.

Graham Barber, retired FA referee, used to live in the village.

A number of films and television shows have been filmed around Dagnall, including First Knight, Dinotopia, Humans (TV series) and Worzel Gummidge.

== Recent developments ==
Improvements made within the village in the last few years include the building of a children's play area and a running track around the recreation ground. The village hall has been extended and refurbished.

More recently, red kites have been observed in increasing numbers and have become a common sight in the village.
