= Aylesbury UTC =

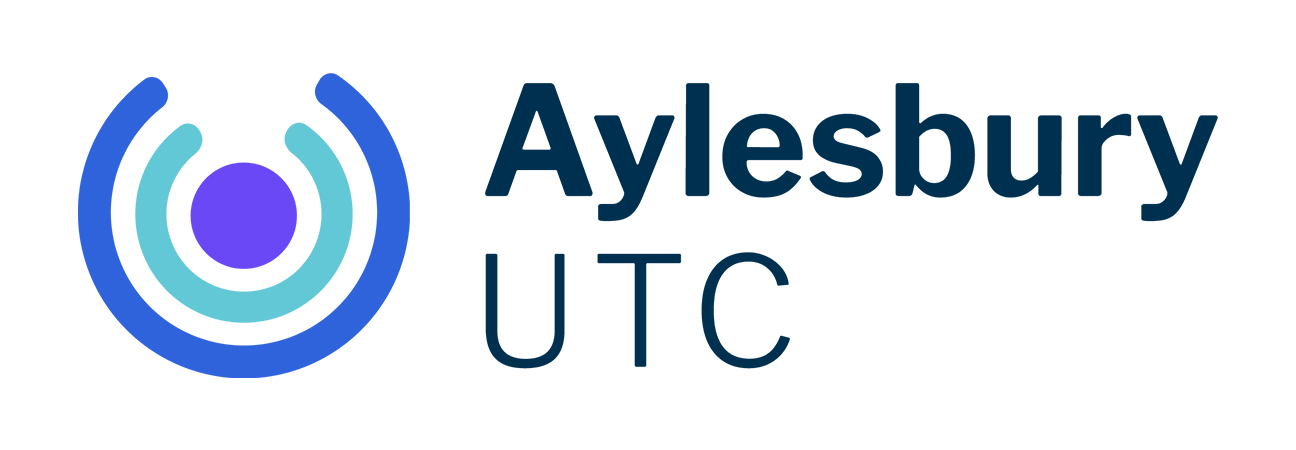

Location
- Oxford Road; Aylesbury, Buckinghamshire, HP21 8PB; England; 51.81435°N 0.82242°W

Information
- Type: University Technical College
- Established: 2013
- Department for Education URN: 139434 Tables
- Ofsted: Reports
- Principal: Joe Dunckley
- Age: 14 to 19
- Enrolment: 116
- Website: www.aylesburyutc.co.uk

Aylesbury UTC is a university technical college (UTC) which opened in September 2013 in Aylesbury, Buckinghamshire, England. The school has an intake of Year 10, Year 11 and Sixth Form, with the addition of Year 9 students from September 2026. The school offers specialist subject courses in Digital, and Health and Social Care.

== Location ==
Aylesbury UTC is located near the Aylesbury Train Station and the bus station and shopping center. It is based next to Aylesbury College and Sir Henry Floyd Grammar School, in Aylesbury, Buckinghamshire, England.

== History ==
Aylesbury UTC moved to the leadership of Merchant Taylors' Oxfordshire Academy Trust in November 2021. A new Principal, Nick Lamb, was also appointed that month. He replaced Sarah Valentine, who left the UTC in October 2021.

In 2022, the school changed its name from Bucks UTC to Aylesbury UTC as part of a rebrand. It also introduced a new specialism subject called Health and Social Care.

In 2023, Joe Dunckley was appointed as the school's fifth Principal since it opened in 2013.

The school stopped offering Building Studies courses in July 2024.

== Sponsors and partners ==
Buckinghamshire New University is the university sponsor of the UTC. Cisco, Buckinghamshire NHS Trust and Amazon are some of the school's other partners. Local employers of Aylesbury UTC include Alcom IT, The Freemantle Trust, Chiltern Rangers and Cloudy IT.

== Admissions ==
Aylesbury UTC had an initial intake of students aged 14 and 16 (academic years 10 and 12) in 2013, but has expanded to accommodate students aged 14 to 19.

== Facilities ==
The building cost £10 million and has solar panels to provide sustainable energy to the facilities and local area. Digital facilities include an Apple Mac lab, creative media workstation suite, green screen and multiple IT suites. There is also a canteen on-site. The school has full disabled access and disabled toilets.

In 2023, Aylesbury UTC opened new facilities for its Health and Social Care specialism. This includes a mock triage, two classrooms, demo home and kitchen areas, and wards.

The school received £120,000 through T-Level Digital specialist equipment allocation funding in 2024.

== Curriculum ==
Aylesbury UTC teaches Digital and Health & Social Care. Pupils aged 14 to 19 follow a programme of study dedicated to one of the specialisms. These programmes include a compulsory core of English, Maths and Science GCSEs. Sixth form students have the option to study T-Level courses and industry certifications. The UTC supports apprenticeships and work experience in conjunction with local partners.

In September 2022, the school introduced its Health & Social Care specialism subject.
