= Northall =

Hamlet in eastern Buckinghamshire, England

Coordinates: 51.872°N 0.611°W

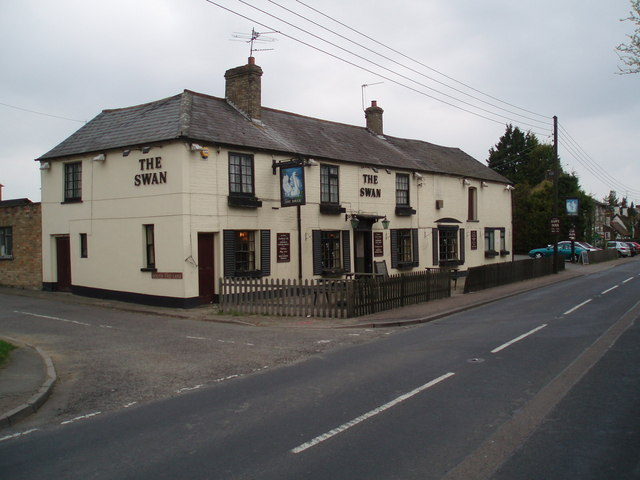
The Swan, Northall, 2006

Northall is a hamlet in the parish of Edlesborough, in Buckinghamshire, England.

This large hamlet straddles the A4146 road halfway between Edlesborough and Billington, Bedfordshire. It has one large Baptist chapel which is still in use. The hamlet has one public house 'The Swan'. An old 16th century public house 'the Village Green' was converted to a private house.

The village was formerly part of the Ashridge Estate of the Earls and Dukes of Bridgwater. Like nearby Slapton it has a few very high gabled cottages, with thickly latticed window panes.
