= Chiltern Way Academy =

Special school in Buckinghamshire, Hampshire, Wokingham England

Chiltern Way Academy Trust
- Bierton/Prestwood/Wendover/Wokingham/Stoke Poges/Basingstoke, Buckinghamshire Hampshire; England

Information
- Type: Special school; Academy
- Motto: Turning Futures Around
- Religious affiliation: None
- Established: April 2016
- Local authority: Buckinghamshire Hampshire
- Department for Education URN: 142695 Tables
- Ofsted: Reports
- Chair: David Mortimer
- Executive Principal: Callum Mansell
- Staff: Stephen Tavender/Charlene Martin/Hannah Moran/Alex Power/Jason Minton/Benn Lee/Ben Lewis/Lauren Fessey/Ben Rowe/
- Gender: Mixed
- Age: 4 to 19
- Website: http://chilternway.org/

The Chiltern Way Academy (established April 2016) is a mix between primary and secondary specialist schools for boys and girls with social, emotional communication and interaction difficulties (SECID). All of the students are between 4 and 19 years of age.

== About The School ==
The school provides education, care and therapies for the range of need that exists across the behaviour spectrum. This includes young people with social and emotional needs and young people with a diagnosis of ASD (Autistic Spectrum Disorder).

The Chiltern Way Academy Trust has nine sites, one based at Stoke Poges, one based in Prestwood, one based in Wendover, one based in Bierton and the other based in Wokingham, and three in Basingstoke. The current head teacher for Bierton is Alex Power. The current head teacher for Wokingham is Lauren Fessey. The current head teacher for Prestwood is Stephen Tavender. The current Deputy head for Prestwood is Shelby Cammun. The current head teacher for Wendover is Charlene Martin. The current head teacher for Sefton Park is Hannah Moran. The current head teacher for Basingstoke is Ben Lewis. The current head teacher for Austen is Jason Minton. The current head teacher for Futures is Benn Lee. The current Deputy head of Futures is Ross Miles.
