= MacIntyre School =

Coordinates: 51.865°N 0.736°W

Location
- Leighton Road; Wingrave, Buckinghamshire, HP22 4PA; England

Information
- Type: Independent Special School
- Local authority: Buckinghamshire
- Department for Education URN: 110564 Tables
- Ofsted: Reports
- Executive Lead: Maria Fiddimore
- Gender: Co-educational
- Age: 10 to 19
- Enrolment: 36
- Website: http://www.macintyrecharity.org/our-services/children-young-people/wingrave-school/

MacIntyre School is a mixed Independent school for children with learning disabilities and/or autism. It is situated in the village of Wingrave near Aylesbury, Buckinghamshire.

The school provides residential and day placements.
