= Furze Down School =

Location
- Verney Road; Winslow, Buckinghamshire, MK18 3BL; England
- Coordinates: 51.9438°N 0.8913°W

Information
- Type: Community special school
- Local authority: Buckinghamshire
- Department for Education URN: 110585 Tables
- Ofsted: Reports
- Headteacher: Alison Rooney
- Gender: Mixed
- Age: 4 to 19
- Enrolment: 224
- Website: http://www.furzedown.bucks.sch.uk/

Furze Down School is a co-educational special education school in Winslow, Buckinghamshire. It is a community school, which takes children from the age of 4 through to the age of 19. The school has approximately 200 pupils.

The school caters for children with a range of special educational needs, including learning difficulties, autism, behavioural, social and emotional difficulties, and language and communication difficulties.

The school was rebuilt in 2015.

The school's most recent Ofsted inspection in February 2024 judged it to be "Outstanding".
