= Prestwood =

Village in Buckinghamshire, England

Coordinates: 51.69284°N 0.731635°W

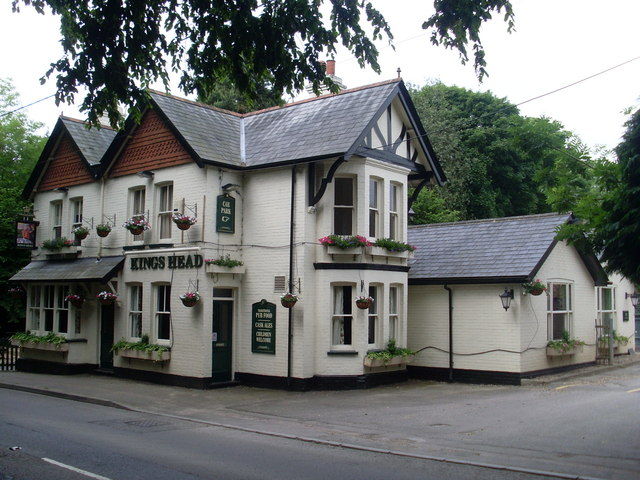
- The Kings Head, Prestwood

- Location within Buckinghamshire
- OS grid reference: SP876006
- Civil parish: Great Missenden
- Unitary authority: Buckinghamshire
- Ceremonial county: Buckinghamshire
- Region: South East
- Country: England
- Sovereign state: United Kingdom
- Post town: Great Missenden
- Postcode district: HP16
- Dialling code: 01494
- Police: Thames Valley
- Fire: Buckinghamshire
- Ambulance: South Central
- UK Parliament: Chesham and Amersham

Prestwood is a village in Buckinghamshire, England. It is located in the Chiltern Hills, about half a mile west of its post town, Great Missenden.

== History ==
=== Early history and creation of parish ===
The village name is Anglo-Saxon in origin, and means "Priest-wood". There is evidence of settlement in Prestwood from the Middle Ages, when the village was mainly covered in oak, beech and ash trees. Hatches Farm is one of the buildings that dates from the medieval period.

By 1849, more of the woodland had been cleared to make way for agriculture and common land, around which approximately 100 houses now existed. Many villagers worked in cottage industries such as lace making, and a wheelwright was also present in the village. Many of the villagers made use of the common land to graze animals; there were about 70 watering ponds. In addition, gorse was harvested for fuel. Beech trees made up the bulk of the woodland, and were used in the local furniture industry. The small village population was served by five separate public houses.

Prestwood came into being as an ecclesiastical parish in 1852, following consecration of the new Holy Trinity Church in 1849. The new parish combined portions of the parishes of Missenden, Hughenden and Hampden. The first vicar of Holy Trinity planted a set of ornamental trees behind the church; this now forms Prestwood Park.

In the Victorian era, Prestwood and nearby Great Missenden lay on the road between London and Birmingham. The two villages became important resting points for travellers; several rest inns came into being. Prestwood's pubs – now numbering twelve – owe part of their legacy to this fact; the name of the Travellers' Rest pub being a notable example.

=== Early 20th century ===
Following 1850, much of the common land was sold off for agricultural development. By 1900, only a small amount of common land remained; today, Prestwood Common on Nairdwood Lane is one of the only pieces of common land still present in the village. Some of the watering holes remained, in addition to wells which were used for drinking water until the pipe network reached Prestwood in the 1930s.

As well as the Holy Trinity church, a Methodist church was constructed on the High Street and another on Bryrants Bottom. In addition, a Baptist chapel was founded on Kiln Lane (now called Kiln Road). The main industry in Prestwood continued to be agriculture; orchards were created and much of the fruit was sold to traders in London.

Prestwood continued to grow in area and population throughout the early part of the 20th century. Prestwood Infant School opened in Moat Lane in 1908, replacing the church school. The village hall was opened in 1928 by Rosamund Parker, Countess of Macclesfield. The arrival of the railway in Great Missenden improved access to central London, leading to Prestwood becoming a commuter village. However, the expansion of the village was not without its setbacks; houses were built in Perks Lane, destroying the orchids that grew there. After a long absence, orchids have recently been spotted in Cadsden near Princes Risborough.

Many agricultural businesses flourished in Prestwood. Wren Davis Dairy opened on Wycombe Road, winning award nationally for the quality of its milk. Today the dairy owns several acres of fields in the north and west of Prestwood, on which its cows still graze. Cornelius Stevens established a farmhouse, gardens, slaughterhouse and butcher's shop (named C. Stevens and Sons) on land then known as Square Farm, in the centre of the village. His four eldest sons took over the business upon his death in 1932; when it closed down in the 1980s, the steel blood bins were buried on land now belonging to Prestwood Junior School. Gaybird Ltd supplied pheasant chicks and eggs to shoots throughout the country, raising the birds in fields stretching from Prestwood as far away as Dunsmore, near Wendover. Their produce was regularly exhibited at the annual national Game Fair. Finally, a pie factory was constructed, called Farmer Giles; the site is now used for an elderly residential home called Giles Gate.

Prestwood was home to former British Prime Minister Earl Attlee from 1950. He later moved to Martinsend Lane in Great Missenden. The house was also occupied by the late musician and broadcaster, Steve Race.

World War II

In the Second World War, a prisoner of war camp was established at Peterley Wood, whilst Prestwood Park House was used as a hospital. Two bombers collided over Prestwood with much of the wreckage falling close to Nanfans (or Nafans) Farm on Honor End Lane. Only one member of the two crews survived the collision. A plaque commemorating the tragedy can be found outside the Limes Tea House at the local garden centre, Hildreths of Prestwood.

=== Late 20th century ===
The Chequers Parade, including the Costcutter and Hopper & Babb's butcher, which are probably among the most commonly used shops.

The Sprinters Fitness Centre, opened in 2003 after delay, boosted the local economy.

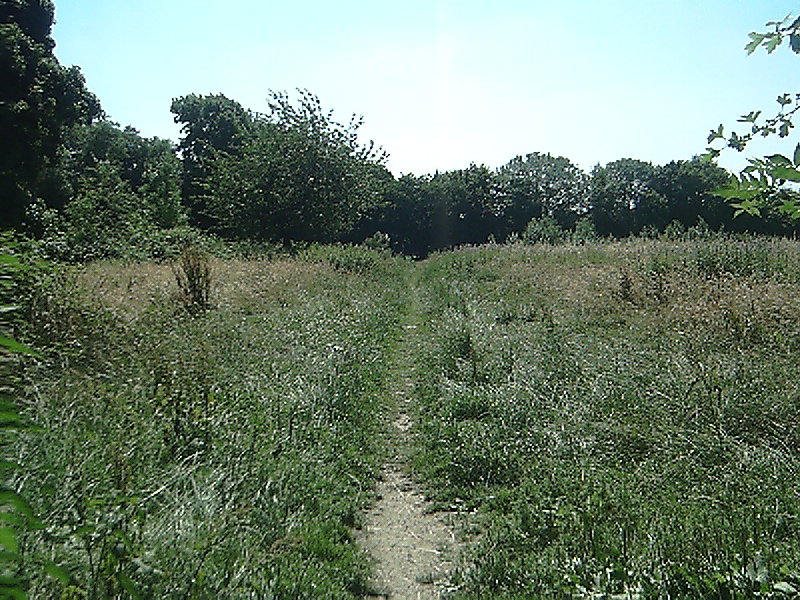
Despite the development of Prestwood, and the local area as a whole, the village retains picturesque fields and rolling hills.

By the 1960s, the last brickworks in the village had closed and many of the orchards had been concreted over; however, the former orchid site at Perks Lane was reclaimed by the local council and turned into a nature reserve and picnic site. Despite the continued growth of the village population, four pubs closed down – the George, the Weathercock, the Golden Ball and the White Horse.

In the 1960s and 70s many large houses were constructed in Prestwood, helping to attract families to the village. This was reflected in the building of two new schools – Prestwood Junior School and Prestwood Lodge School.

Despite the loss of the London Underground steam service to the nearby Great Missenden railway station, an overground service has and still does continue, run by Chiltern Railways. These benefits are one reason for the district in which Prestwood lies (Chiltern) being the most expensive rural district in the entire United Kingdom.

=== Present day ===
In January 2000 a further elderly home consisting of 30 flats was opened, called Cherry Orchard, leading to an increase in the number of retired people living in the village. In the early hours of Saturday 9 December 2006, a large fire swept through the Cherry Orchard residential home, killing one elderly woman and forcing 12 others to be rescued. Most of the ground floor was gutted in the fire, which started when a resident left clothes on top of a faulty electric radiator; all of the residents were moved out until rebuilding work could be completed.

In 2001, the old Prestwood Leisure Centre was demolished. After a much-delayed rebuilding programme over the following two years, the Sprinters Fitness Centre opened in its place in 2003. It included three newly built tennis courts and two fitness studios. The opening helped to revitalise Prestwood's economy and continues to attract people from the surrounding area.

The land on which Prestwood's only petrol station existed was bought by Beeks Homes Ltd in 2002. The petrol station was demolished on the premise that, whilst new homes would be built on the site, a smaller petrol station would also be included in the plans. When Beeks turned back on these plans, two years of legal wranglings ensued between the company and the parish council; eventually, the council relented and solely homes were constructed.

In July 2007 a new park was built on Prestwood common and was opened by Cherie Blair.

In March 2016 the public house formerly known as The Chequers relaunched as The Chequers Tree after locals objected to it being renamed as The Prestwood by owners Greene King.

== Listed buildings ==
Prestwood has 28 buildings listed on the National Heritage List; all are listed Grade II. On Green Lane, Cherry Cottage, Clayton House, Hampden Farm, the Thimble Farm Cottages, and Greenlands Farm and its garden gateway are all listed. The Polecat public house on Wycombe Road is also listed.

The barn and farmhouse at Collings Hanger Farm on Wycombe Road, Pankridge Farm and Moat Farm on Moat Lane, and the farmhouse, garden gates and railings, large barn, cartshed, and smaller barn at Andlows Farm on Green Lane are all listed agricultural buildings in Prestwood.

The Church of Holy Trinity its lynch gate and the church school and Church Cottage at 134 Wycombe Road are listed, as well as Prestwood Park House behind the church.

Rose Cottage at 186 Wycombe Road and Knives Farmhouse at 150 Wycombe Road, Lady Boys on Kiln Road, The Flint Cottage and the Old Chequers Cottage on Chequers Lane, and the East Cottage and the Thatched Cottage on Honor End Lane are all individually listed houses in Prestwood.

== Education ==
There are two primary schools in Prestwood: Prestwood Infant School, for 4 to 7-year-olds; Prestwood Junior School, for 7 to 11-year-olds. In June 2008, Prestwood Infant School celebrated its centenary.

The local catchment secondary schools are the Misbourne School, an upper school, and Dr Challoner's Grammar School (boys), Dr Challoner's High School (girls), Chesham Grammar School (mixed) and The Royal Grammar School for Boys which are all Grammar Schools.

Prestwood is also the location of the Prestwood Campus of Chiltern Way Academy, a special school for children from the age of 11 to 18.

== Residents' Groups ==
Prestwood is located within the Parish Council area of Great Missenden, but is much larger than the town of Great Missenden. Prestwood Community Association (PCA) was created in 2024 as a dedicated, proactive group that would take a holistic view on behalf of all residents and stakeholders. One of many residents' groups within Prestwood, PCA works to improve the village's environment and amenities. It organises an annual multi-event, multi-venue 'Prestwood Big Week' in June, culminating in 'Prestfest', a music-led celebration on the Common and Recreation Ground.

Prestwood Nature is the local environment group for the central area of the Chiltern Hills in Buckinghamshire. Its area covers a 3 kilometre radius from Prestwood and includes the villages of Great Missenden, Great and Little Kingshill, Great and Little Hampden, North Dean and Speen. It organises events and maintains and organises working parties at various sites around the area. Prestwood Nature and Prestwood Community Association are working together to secure the future of the Sheepwash Pond, a historical site and natural amenity.

Earlier residents' groups included The Prestwood Society (founded 1971) and Prestwood Village Association (founded 2013). Both closed, in 2015 and 2026 respectively, citing struggles to recruit enough new volunteers.

== Sport and leisure ==
Prestwood has a Non-League football club Prestwood F.C. who play at Prestwood Sports Club on Honor Road. There is also a cricket club at the same venue.

There is a children's Football Club, Prestwood Colts and Girls F.C., who play at Prestwood Common.

Missenden badminton club meets at Prestwood Junior School on Wednesday evenings.

The village is also home to one of the largest gymnastic clubs in Buckinghamshire, which is held at Prestwood Junior School on weekday evenings and Saturday mornings. In 2015 the club was given planning permission to build a dedicated gymnastics centre at Sprinters Leisure Centre in Prestwood

Prestwood Local Nature Reserve is located off Hampden Road.

== Transport ==
Great Missenden railway station, about half a mile away, is on the Chiltern Railways London to Aylesbury Line and provides train services to London Marylebone station in approximately 45 minutes.

Bus services, run by Arriva Shires & Essex, run to High Wycombe in one direction, and Great Missenden and Chesham in the other. From Great Missenden, it is also possible to connect to other bus services to Aylesbury and Hemel Hempstead.

== Notable people ==
- Former prime minister Clement Attlee used to live in Prestwood, and after retiring he took his seat in the House of Lords as Earl Attlee and Viscount Prestwood.
- Actor and comedian Noel Fielding also used to live in the village whilst studying in Wycombe.

== Other trivia ==
- During the 19th century Prestwood was famous for its cherry orchards and parties of Londoners would travel out to the area during the spring to view the blossoms.
- Chequers, the country residence of the Prime Minister, is a few miles north of the village. Former Prime Minister Tony Blair often brought his family to the Great Missenden Catholic church in Great Missenden at the weekends.
