= Winslow, Buckinghamshire =

Market town in Buckinghamshire, England

Coordinates: 51.940°N 0.887°W

Winslow
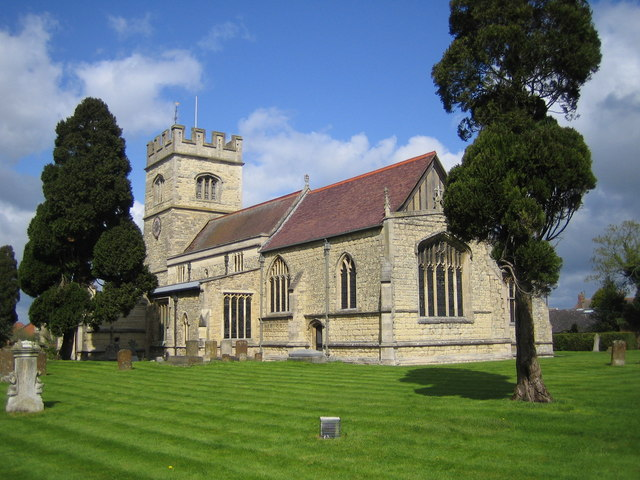
- St Laurence's parish church

- Location within Buckinghamshire
- Environs of Winslow
- Population: 5,236 (2021 Census)
- OS grid reference: SP7627
- Civil parish: Winslow
- Unitary authority: Buckinghamshire
- Ceremonial county: Buckinghamshire
- Region: South East
- Country: England
- Sovereign state: United Kingdom
- Post town: Buckingham
- Postcode district: MK18
- Dialling code: 01296
- Police: Thames Valley
- Fire: Buckinghamshire
- Ambulance: South Central
- UK Parliament: Buckingham and Bletchley

Winslow /ˈwɪnzloʊ/ is a market town and civil parish in north Buckinghamshire, England, within the Buckinghamshire Council unitary authority area. It is located approximately 6 miles (9.7 km) south-east of Buckingham, and 7 miles (11 km) south-west of Bletchley (Milton Keynes). The town had a population of 5,236 at the 2021 census.

== History ==
Winslow was first recorded in a royal charter of 792–793 in which it was granted by Offa of Mercia to St Albans Abbey as Wineshauue, which means 'Wine's Burial Mound'. Compare Old English: hlaw, 'low hill, mound'. The Domesday Book of 1086 records it as Weneslai.

A late Celtic copper torc has been found here, and also a silver drinking-cup of late Roman design.

The 1841 census reveals the population that year was 1,333.

== Notable buildings ==
Winslow Hall sits on the main road leading into the town from Aylesbury. It was built possibly from the designs of Sir Christopher Wren by William Lowndes, secretary to the Treasury. His name and the date 1700 can be seen on the frieze over the door.

The Anglican parish church in High Street, dating from about 1320 is dedicated to St. Laurence (St Laurence's Church, Winslow), and is twinned with St Paul's Church in Winslow, Arizona. The church has a ring of 8 bells, the heaviest weighing 19 long cwt (970 kg).

The half-timbered Bell Hotel was first recorded in the late 16th century and soon became the main hostelry in the town.

Keach's Baptist Chapel, dating from 1695 in its present form, is probably the oldest surviving nonconformist chapel in Buckinghamshire.

== Main roads ==
- High Street (A413)
- Buckingham Road (A413)
- Sheep Street (A413)
- Horn Street
- Vicarage Road
- Bennets Hill (A413)
- Verney Road
- Burleys Road
- Granborough Road
- East Claydon Road
- Great Horwood Road (B4033)
- Shipton (B4032)
- Swanbourne Road (B4032)
- Station Road
- Magpie Way
- Elmfields Gate
- Little Horwood Road
- Furze Lane

== Leisure ==
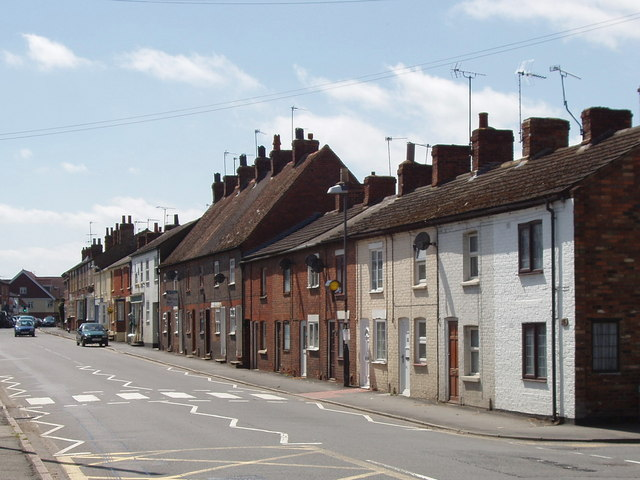
Winslow High Street

The Whaddon Chase fox hunt has traditionally met in Winslow Market Square every Boxing Day. The occasion is very well attended with over 1,000 people visiting the town on Boxing Day each year. The Silver Band from the nearby village of Great Horwood playing Christmas carols have often been in attendance. Other annual events in the town include a beer festival in March, and the Winslow Show, a gymkhana and agricultural show held every August on Sheep Street, across the road from Winslow Hall.

Winslow Hall Opera, formerly known as Stowe Opera, was reformed after a gap of six years. Since 2012 it has performed in the grounds of Winslow Hall.

In 2017, Sir Thomas Fremantle's new school site has brought a much needed expansion of sporting facilities to the town. These include a four-court sports hall, large dance studio, fitness suite and a range of all-weather pitches.

== Modern housing developments ==
Verney Road Estate - Phase 1 - Built in the 2010s by Bellway and Cala Homes

Phase 2 - Built in 2015 by Bloor Homes

Phase 3 - Built in 2016/17 by Bloor Homes

Phase 4 - Currently being built by Bloor Homes

Phase 5 - Planned in the 2020s as stated in the Winslow Neighbourhood Plan (WNP)

Land at Tinkers End - Also planned in the WNP and going through planning process.

== Transport ==
The A413 road linking Buckingham and Aylesbury, runs through the centre of Winslow, forming the high street. This was originally the Wendover to Buckingham Turnpike, which was diverted to go through Winslow by Act of Parliament in 1742.

Until the late 1960s, the town was served by Winslow railway station on the Varsity Line between Oxford and Cambridge, with a spur to Aylesbury. As part of the East West Rail project, the line is to be reopened by late 2025, a new station has been built on the western outskirts of the town. When in operation, it is to provide new rail services to Milton Keynes Central and Oxford railway stations.

The Sustrans National Cycle Route 51 (Oxford – Colchester) goes east–west through Winslow, via Milton Keynes or Bicester. A 5.6-mile (9.0 km) shared use path between Buckingham and Winslow was completed in 2017.

Bus services to and through Winslow include Arriva Shires & Essex's X6 Aylesbury – Milton Keynes via Buckingham, the route 60 Aylesbury – Buckingham, and the route 50 Milton Keynes – Winslow. There are also numerous Winslow Community Bus Services.

== Winslow town council ==
Winslow Town Council (WTC) is a group of 12 members, split into 4 committees : Amenities, Development, Events, and Finances and General Purposes. The Town Council meets around once a month.

The Council is made up of 2 Liberal Democrats, 1 Labour, 2 Conservatives and 7 Independent councillors.

| Party | Number of Councillors (2022) |
|---|---|
| Liberal Democrats | 2 |
| Conservatives | 2 |
| Labour | 1 |
| Independent | 7 |
| Total | 12 |

== Education ==
Winslow is home to Furze Down School for children with special educational needs, aged 5–19. The town is also served by Winslow Church of England School, which is a mixed, voluntary controlled primary school, that takes children from ages four to eleven. As of 2018, the school has approximately 520 pupils.

State Secondary schools for Winslow children are Sir Thomas Fremantle School (a free school) in Winslow; the Buckingham School (a secondary modern) and the Royal Latin School (a grammar school) in nearby Buckingham; the Cottesloe School in Wing; and a range of comprehensive schools in Milton Keynes.

== Media ==
Local news and television programmes are provided by BBC South and ITV Meridian. Television signals are received from the Oxford TV transmitter.

Local radio stations are BBC Three Counties Radio, Heart East, Greatest Hits Radio Bucks, Beds and Herts (formerly Mix 96) and 3Bs Radio, a community based station that broadcast from Buckingham as well as to Bicester and Brackley.

The Buckingham & Winslow Advertiser is the town's local newspaper.

== Sport ==
The local football team are Winslow United who play in the Premier Division of the Spartan South Midlands Football League.

Winslow RUFC were formed in 1992 and play at the Winslow Centre (the old school) in the Berks, Bucks and Oxon Championship. Their Clubhouse is currently based at the Nags Head on Sheep Street.

Winslow Town Cricket Club, which is based at Elmfield's Gate, next to the football pitch, currently field three men's Saturday teams. Two teams play in the Morrants Four Counties League: the first XI play in Division 1 and the seconds in Division 4. The third XI play mainly at Winslow's secondary pitch at Padbury near Buckingham. The club also fields a Sunday team, which plays other local Sunday teams, and fields many youth teams, ranging from Under 9s to under 15s.

== Twin towns ==
Winslow has been twinned with Cours-la-Ville in France since 1980.
