= Buckingham School =

The Buckingham School

Location
- London Road; Buckingham, Buckinghamshire, MK18 1AT; England; 51.994638°N 0.983952°W

Information
- Type: Community secondary modern
- Motto: Success for all through Achievement, Challenge & Enjoyment
- Established: 1935
- Local authority: Buckinghamshire
- Department for Education URN: 110484 Tables
- Ofsted: Reports
- Chair of Governors: Matthew Watkins
- Headteacher: Andy McGinnes
- Gender: Co-educational
- Age: 11 to 18
- Enrolment: 1,100
- Houses: Swan; Silverstone; Whittlebury; Chandos; Claydon; Stowe
- Colours: Black and amber
- Website: www.buckinghamschool.org

The Buckingham School is a co-educational secondary school in Buckingham, Buckinghamshire, United Kingdom.

It is a community school, which takes children from the age of 11 through to the age of 18. The school has approximately 1100 pupils.

Students study at Key Stage 3 (Years 7–9), before choosing their Level 2 (GCSE and BTEC) options for study in Years 10 and 11. In the sixth form, there is a range of A Level and BTEC Level 3 subjects on offer.

Following the ending of Specialist School status programme by the DfE, the school kept the label of "Specialist Sports College".

The school has six houses, which are named after important local features. They are: Chandos, Claydon, Silverstone, Stowe, Swan and Whittlebury.

In recent years the school has been acknowledged by Ofsted as a good school (2016 and 2020).
