= The Grange School, Aylesbury =

The Grange School
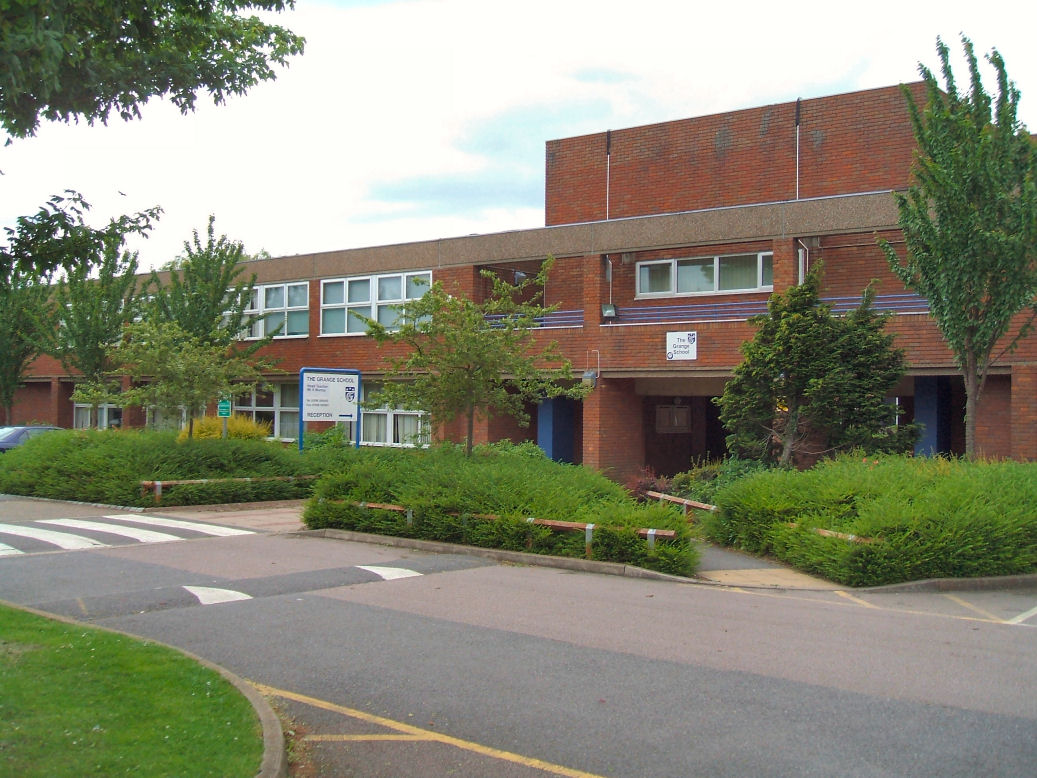

Location
- Wendover Way; Aylesbury, Buckinghamshire, HP21 7NH; England; 51°48′33″N 0°47′57″W

Information
- Type: Foundation school
- Motto: We Can
- Established: 1954
- Local authority: Buckinghamshire County Council
- Trust: Aylesbury Learning Partnership
- Specialist: Business & Enterprise
- Department for Education URN: 110488 Tables
- Ofsted: Reports
- Head teacher: Vince Murray
- Gender: Mixed
- Age range: 11–18
- Enrolment: 1,323 (2018)
- Capacity: 1,375
- Website: www.grange.bucks.sch.uk

The Grange School is an 11–18 mixed, foundation secondary school and sixth form in Aylesbury, Buckinghamshire, England. It was established in 1954. The current headmaster is Vince Murray.

== History ==
In 1959, the school was visited by Princess Marina, Duchess of Kent in celebration of the 10th anniversary of Mother's Clubs in Buckinghamshire. The school is notable as the location where the jury retired to consider their verdict in the Great Train Robbery case in 1963. They used the room that is now the main office of the youth centre on the school site.

In November 2008, the school was awarded Business and Enterprise status.

== Notable alumni ==
- Jake Gray, professional footballer
- Robert Hall, professional footballer
- Samantha Louise Lewthwaite, terrorist suspect and widow of 7/7 suicide bomber
- John Otway, singer-songwriter
- Charlie Palmer (footballer)
- Matt Phillips, professional footballer
- Iain Rogerson, actor
- Ellen White, professional footballer
