= Cottesloe School =

Secondary school in England

The Cottesloe School

Location
- Buckinghamshire, Buckinghamshire; England; 51.892373°N 0.721836°W

Information
- Type: Secondary
- Motto: Prepare, Aspire, Succeed
- Local authority: Buckinghamshire
- Department for Education URN: 110533 Tables
- Ofsted: Reports
- Headteacher: Zack Wallis
- Gender: Co-educational
- Age: 11 to 18
- Enrolment: 1,300
- Website: https://www.cottesloe.bucks.sch.uk

The Cottesloe School, formerly known as Wing County Secondary School, which changed its name in 1993 is a secondary school near Wing, Buckinghamshire, England. It occupies a large rural site with views of the countryside in one direction and overlooking Wing village in the other. The school takes children from 11 to 18. The school has 1300 students, of whom over 170 are in the Sixth Form. The school serves a large rural catchment in the north of Buckinghamshire, as well as parts of Bedfordshire and Hertfordshire. Since 2009, the school has been oversubscribed at Year 7.

The previous Ofsted report in 2009 stated; “A high proportion of parents responded to the parental questionnaire. The majority are positive about the work of the school, in particular the recent improvements. Parents value the support provided by the school for students.”

== History ==
Formerly Wing County Secondary School, opened officially on July 7, 1960. In 1993, it became grant-maintained and changed its name to The Cottesloe School.

The origins of The Cottesloe School's name were explained at the inauguration of the Grant Maintained School in Wing. Her Majesty's Lord Lieutenant for Bucks, The Hon Commander John Fremantle, whose father is the present Lord Cottesloe, said the name was first recorded in the Domesday Book. His great, great-grandfather was the first Lord Cottesloe. The title was given to him for his father's service to Nelson.

The Cottesloe School has grown rapidly. Work on the dining room and its kitchens were completed in February 2011. A £3 Million Sports Hall and new classroom block facilities had been created and fully finished by 2016.

== Sixth Form ==
In 2005, fewer than 70 students attended the Sixth Form but in 2010, there were over 170 on roll. This has impacted on facilities but with the new dining hall in place as of February 2011.

Each year there is a Head Boy, Head Girl, and Deputies appointed and these help constitute the Sixth Form Committee.
