= Aylesbury Hundred =

English Administrative Division

Coordinates: 51.8168°N 0.8124°W

- Aylesbury Hundred (black) shown in Buckinghamshire
- Area
  - 1861: 66,207 acres (267.93 km^{2})
- Population
  - 1887: 27,913
- History
  - Created: 11th century
  - Abolished: 1887s
- Status: Hundred
  - HQ: Aylesbury
- Subdivisions
  - Type: Parishes

Aylesbury Hundred was a hundred in the ceremonial county of Buckinghamshire, England. It was situated in the centre of the county and was bounded on the east by Hertfordshire and on the west by Oxfordshire.

== History ==
Until at least the time of the Domesday Survey in 1086 there were 18 hundreds in Buckinghamshire. It has been suggested however that neighbouring hundreds had already become more closely associated in the 11th century so that by the end of the 14th century the original or ancient hundreds had been consolidated into 8 larger hundreds. Aylesbury became the name of the hundred formed from the combined 11th century hundreds of Aylesbury, Risborough and Stone although these original names still persisted in official records until at least the early part of the 17th century. The court leet for Aylesbury hundred was located at Aylesbury.

== Parishes and hamlets ==
Aylesbury hundred comprised the following ancient parishes and hamlets, (formerly medieval vills), allocated to their respective 13th century hundred:

Aylesbury	Risborough	Stone
Aylesbury (with Walton)	Bledlow (with Bledlow Ridge)	Cuddington
Aston Clinton	Horsenden	Dinton (with Ford and Upton)
Bierton (with Broughton)	Monks Risborough	Haddenham
Buckland	Princes Risborough	Great Hampden
Ellesborough		Little Hampden
Halton		Hartwell
Hulcott		Great Kimble
The Lee		Little Kimble
Great Missenden		Stone
Little Missenden		
Stoke Mandeville		
Weston Turville		
Wendover		

== See also ==
- List of hundreds of England and Wales
