= Coombe, Buckinghamshire =

Hamlet in Buckinghamshire, England

Coordinates: 51.74815°N 0.77885°W

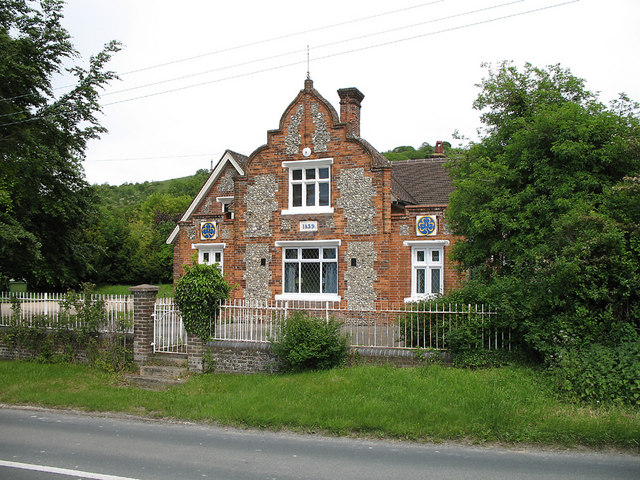
Dutch gable architecture in Coombe

Coombe is a hamlet in the parish of Ellesborough in the English county of Buckinghamshire, situated between Coombe Hill and Chequers, the official country residence of the prime minister of the United Kingdom. At the 2011 Census the population of the hamlet was included in the civil parish of Wendover.

The hamlet is situated on the Missenden Road that leads from Butlers Cross to Great and Little Hampden. The Buckinghamshire headquarters of the Girl Guides are situated in Coombe, as is part of Ellesborough Golf Club.
