= Chalkshire =

Hamlet in Buckinghamshire, England

Coordinates: 51.761°N 0.779°W

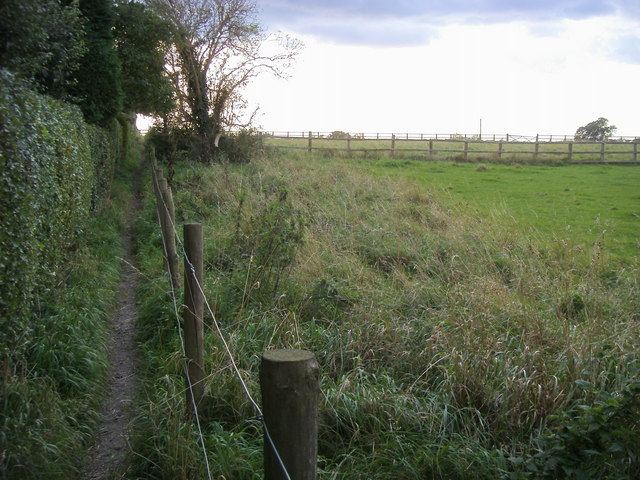
Aylesbury Ring footpath squeezes up between the hedge and fields heading away from Chalkshire Road, 2008

Chalkshire is a hamlet in the parish of Ellesborough (where the 2011 Census population was included), in Buckinghamshire, England. It is situated on the road that runs from Butlers Cross to Terrick.

The hamlet name is fairly modern, and is quite literal in meaning. It refers to the composition of the nearby Chiltern Hills, at the foot of which the hamlet stands.
