= Terrick (disambiguation) =

Terrick is a hamlet in Buckinghamshire, England.

Terrick may also refer to:

- a hamlet in the Shire of Loddon, Victoria, Australia
- Terrick Terrick National Park, Victoria, Australia

== People with the surname ==
- Richard Terrick (1710–1777), Church of England clergyman and bishop of London
- Samuel Terrick (c.1602–1675), English politician
