= John Colet =

English priest and scholar (1467–1519)

The Reverend John Colet
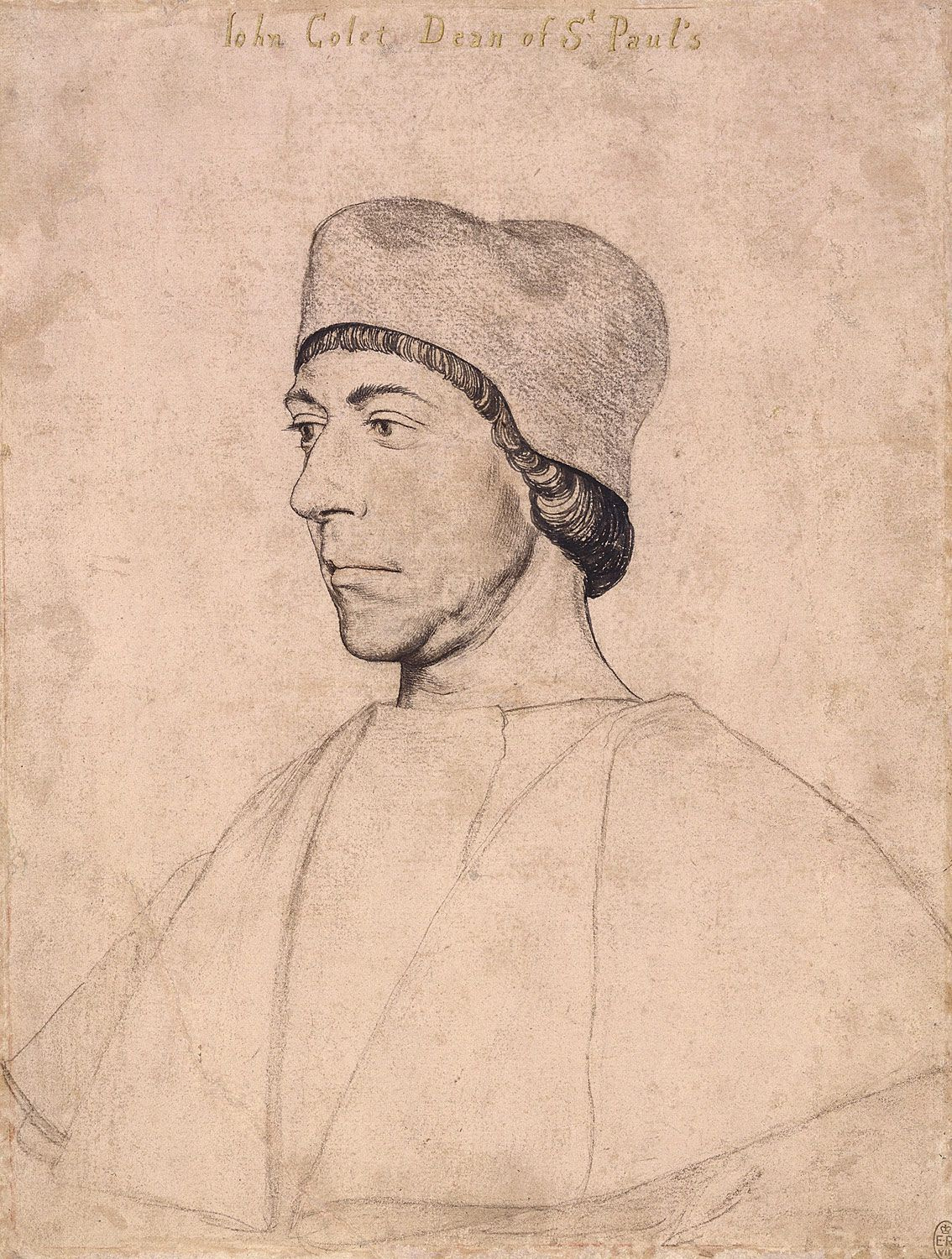
- Portrait drawing by Hans Holbein the Younger
- Born: January 1467; London, England
- Died: 16 September 1519 (aged 52); Sheen, Surrey, England

Education
- Education: Magdalen College, Oxford

Philosophical work
- Era: Renaissance philosophy
- Region: Western philosophy
- School: Renaissance humanism
- Institutions: University of Oxford
- Main interests: Theology

John Colet (/ˈkɒlɪt/; January 1467 – 16 September 1519) was an English Catholic priest, and educational pioneer.

Colet was an English scholar, Renaissance humanist, theologian, member of the Worshipful Company of Mercers, and Dean of St Paul's Cathedral, London. Colet wanted people to see the scripture as their guide through life. Furthermore, he wanted to restore theology and rejuvenate Christianity. Colet is an important early leader of Christian humanism as he linked humanism and reform. John Colet was a friend of Erasmus, a key figure in Christian humanism.

== Early life and education ==
John Colet was born in London in January 1467, the eldest son of Sir Henry Colet (Lord Mayor of London 1486 and 1495). He was educated at St Anthony's school and at Magdalen College, Oxford, where he took his M.A. in 1490. He was already nonresident rector of Dennington, Suffolk, and vicar of St Dunstan's, Stepney, and now became rector of Thurning, Hunts. In 1493 he went to Paris and then to Italy, studying canon and civil law, patristics and Greek.

== Time abroad ==
During his time abroad, he became acquainted with Budaeus (Guillaume Budé) and Erasmus, and with the teaching of Savonarola. On his return to England in 1496 he took orders and settled in Oxford, where he lectured on the epistles of Saint Paul, replacing the old scholastic method of interpretation with one more in harmony with the new learning. Due to their influences, when he arrived back in England, he returned more than just a humanist; he returned a Christian reformer. His methods did much to influence Erasmus, who visited Oxford in 1498, and who later received an annuity from Colet.

== Holding office ==
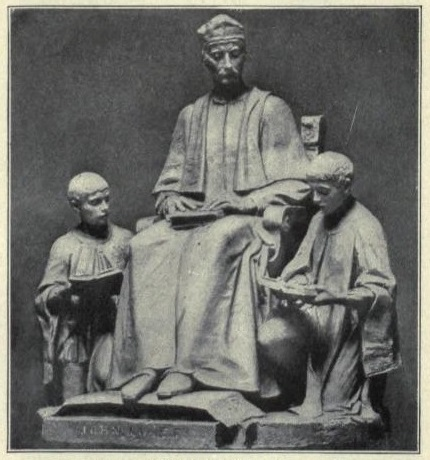
Statue of Dean Colet by Sir William Hamo Thornycroft.

Since 1494, Colet had been prebendary of York, and canon of St Martin le Grand, London. In 1502 he became prebendary of Salisbury, in 1505 prebendary of St Paul's, and immediately afterwards its dean, having previously taken the degree of doctor of divinity. He continued to lecture on the books of the Bible; and he soon afterwards established a perpetual divinity lecture, three days each week, in St Paul's itself. While at St. Paul's between 1505 and 1519, Colet used his preaching, administration, scriptural exegesis and education towards Church reform.

Around 1508, having inherited his father's wealth, Colet formed his plan for the re-foundation of St Paul's School, which he completed in 1512, and endowed with estates of an annual value of £122 and upwards. The school, dedicated to the Infant Jesus, was in place to give young boys a Christian education.

The celebrated grammarian William Lilye was the first master, and the company of mercers were (in 1510) appointed trustees, the first example of non-clerical management in education. Some held Colet's religious opinions to be heretical, but William Warham, the Archbishop of Canterbury, refused to prosecute him. King Henry VIII also held him in high esteem despite his sermons against the French wars.

Colet was rector of the guild of Jesus at St Paul's Cathedral and chaplain to Henry VIII. In 1514 he made the Canterbury pilgrimage and in 1515 preached at Wolsey's installation as cardinal.

== Sermons ==
Colet had many distinguished sermons. One is the beginning of the Convocation of the clergy of Canterbury province at St Paul's Cathedral on 6 February 1512. Archbishop Warham of Canterbury invited Colet to speak on this occasion. Colet's speech is both direct and insightful. It represents his work, or as Colet said himself, he is "speaking out of zeal, a man sorrowing for the ruin of the Church". Furthermore, Colet stated that he came "…here today, fathers, to admonish you with all your minds to deliberate, in this your Council, concerning the reformation of the Church". The Convocation sermon is one of the most well known of his sermons. In addition, Colet gave a notable sermon before the royal court on Good Friday, 1513. He spoke in the wake of political tension; specifically, an English push for war against France. On this occasion, Colet condemned war and prompted Christians to fight only for Jesus Christ.

== Christian humanism ==
Colet's writings are reflective and added to the tradition of Christian humanism. He studied Cicero, Augustine, Jerome, John Chrysostom, Ignatius of Antioch, Lactantius and Polycarp.

In his writings, Colet refers to Italian humanists and Platonists Marsilio Ficino and Pico della Mirandola.

Erasmus said of Colet, "When I listen to Colet it seems to me that I am listening to Plato himself." Erasmus likely portrayed Colet to show that one could be highly critical of the Church while still a loyal priest. His depiction of Colet was partly a depiction of himself.

== Studied over time ==
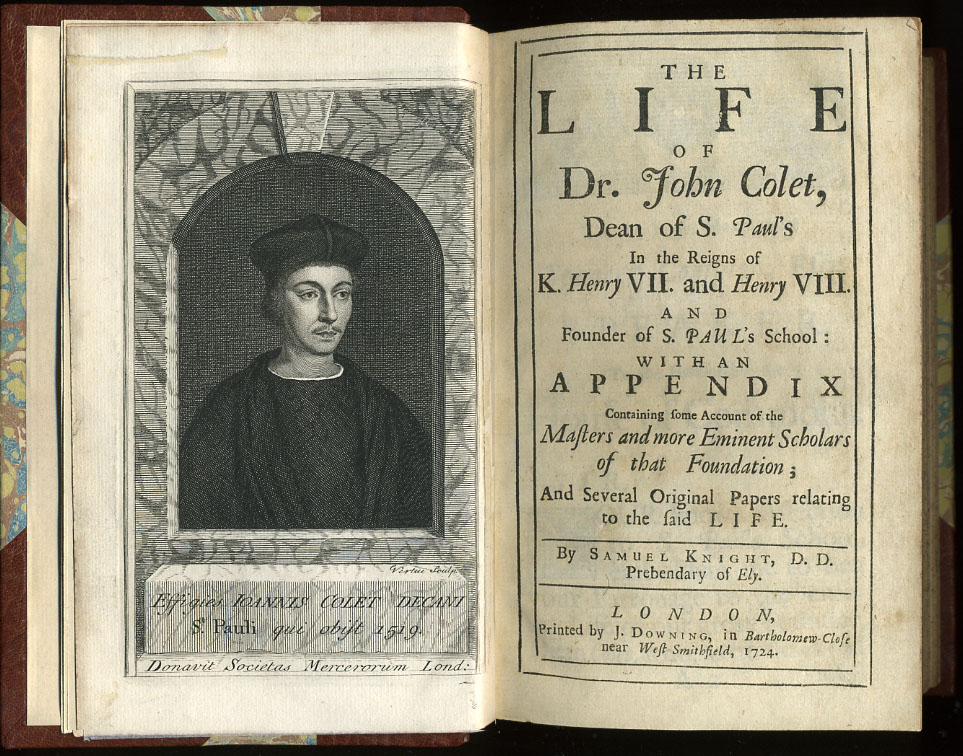
Frontispiece and titlepage of "The Life of Dr John Colet", Dean of St Paul's" by Samuel Knight, 1724.

Colet has been studied frequently over time and has experienced resurgences in popularity. Bishop Kennett studied Colet during the seventeenth and eighteenth centuries. Kennett passed his notes to Samuel Knight who used them to write a biography of Colet which was published in 1724. During the nineteenth century, interest in Colet increased. Several editions of his works and an additional biography were published during that time. Scholars believed Colet strongly impacted his friend Erasmus and the English Reformation. Later critics went on to view Colet as Protestant-like, though others believe that Colet was merely a reform preacher that wanted to improve the quality of the Church.

Colet died in 1519 of the "sweating sickness." His monument was erected on the south aisle of the choir at the cathedral church of Saint Paul but destroyed in the Great Fire of London.

== Other works ==
In addition to his sermons Colet's works include some scriptural commentary and works entitled Daily Devotions and Monition to a Godly Life. Together with Lilye, Erasmus, and Wolsey, Colet produced materials forming the basis of the authorised Latin Grammar, used for centuries in the English schools. A number of letters from Colet to Erasmus also survive.

== Lasting influence of Colet ==
To this day, Colet's achievement is celebrated by St Paul's School, St Paul's Girls' School and St Paul's Prep School (formerly known as St Paul's Juniors, and, prior to that, Colet Court) on John Colet Day at St Paul's Cathedral (having begun in 2003).

The John Colet School in Wendover, Buckinghamshire is named after him, as well as Colet Gardens, a road in the London suburb of Hammersmith, W6, and John Colet School in Sydney, Australia.

== Colet's convocation sermon (1512) ==
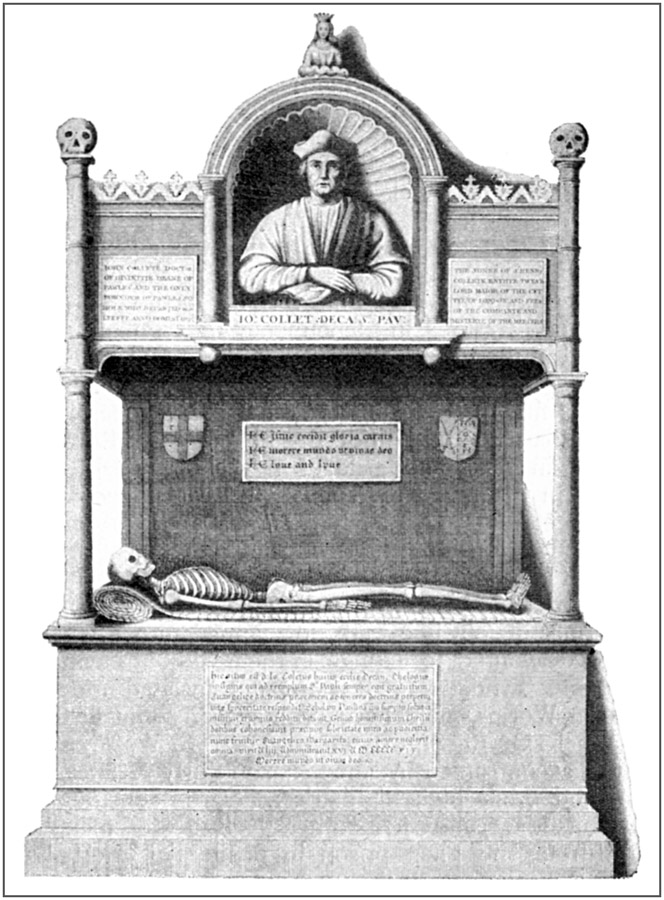
Tomb of John Colet, D.D., Dean of St. Paul's. After Hollar.

In the introductory paragraph, Colet concludes by stating that his presence is due to the need for the Council to consider a Church reformation. First, Colet criticises the living style of the priests. Colet explains that the priests should set an example for others as be a beacon of light, because if they are instead figures of darkness, the Church will be engulfed by darkness. Colet cites four evils, referencing the Apostle, that constitute the corrupt, priestly living: devilish pride, carnal concupiscence, worldly covetousness, and worldly occupations.

First, in regard to pride of life, Colet believes that priests of the day were more consumed by the honour and dignity one could receive by being a part of the priesthood. Service to the Church must be only humble service.

Secondly, many priests take part in the lust for the flesh: feasting and banqueting, vain conversation, sports, plays, hunting, and hawking. They are "drowned in the delights of this world" and "patronize those who cater for their pleasure".

Thirdly, covetousness is the third worldly evil, which is also known as lust. Colet calls this a plague that has overtaken many priests and blinded many. Many take part in the Church only for the hope of riches and promotions. Priests forget that they should be interested in the good they can do more than the amount of riches that they stand to gain. Paul called covetousness the root of all evils. From it, benefices stack up, including pensions and tithes. Colet states that: "every corruption, all the ruin of the Church, all the scandals of the world, come from the covetousness of priests".

The fourth evil arises because priests have become more servants of men than servants of God. According to Paul, priests are supposed to be an intermediary between men and God. As such, warfare should only be spiritual in nature and reflective of Jesus. In addition, they need to pray, read, and meditate regarding the Scriptures. They must deliver the word of God, give the sacraments of salvation, make sacrifices for people, and hold masses for people's souls.

Colet then moves on to discuss the needed clergy reform. Paul orders that people must "be reformed into a new mind". People should turn to humility, sobriety, charity, and spiritual occupations. Reform must begin with the priests so that it can spread throughout the Church. Colet disagrees with the creation of new laws; instead he thinks that the old laws must simply be enforced.

Colet believes several things are important: a good, pure, and holy life, approved morals, moderate knowledge of the Scriptures, knowledge of the Sacraments, the fear of God and love of the heavenly life.

Finally, Colet urges people to "return to the God of love and peace; return to Christ, in whom is the true peace of the Spirit which passeth all understanding; return to the true priestly life". "Be ye reformed in the newness of your minds, that ye may know those things which are of God; and the peace of God shall be with you".

== Memorial ==
There was a memorial to him in the south aisle at Old St Paul's Cathedral.

A bronze statue of John Colet with two pupils, made by Hamo Thornycroft in 1902, has a prominent position near the entrance of St Paul's School, London.

== See also ==
- List of Erasmus's correspondents
