= Dunsmore, Buckinghamshire =

Hamlet in Buckinghamshire, England

Coordinates: 51.73905°N 0.75275°W

Dunsmore
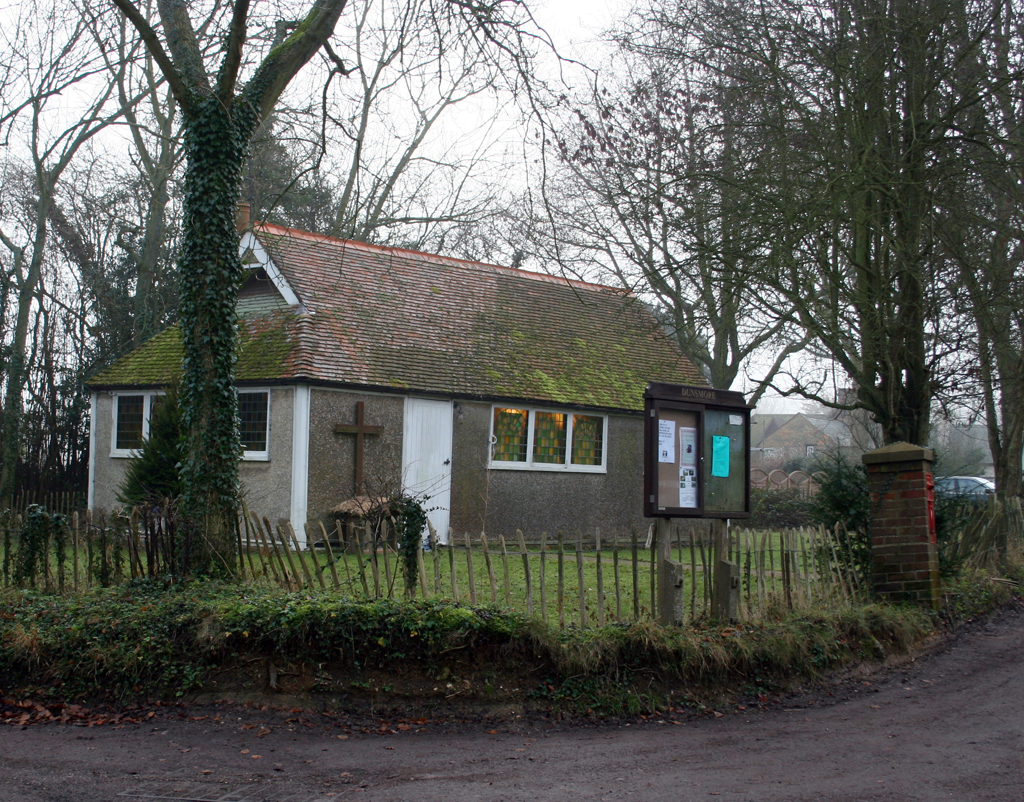
- The Church of the Resurrection, Dunsmore

- Location within Buckinghamshire
- Unitary authority: Buckinghamshire
- Ceremonial county: Buckinghamshire
- Region: South East
- Country: England
- Sovereign state: United Kingdom
- Post town: AYLESBURY
- Postcode district: HP22
- Police: Thames Valley
- Fire: Buckinghamshire
- Ambulance: South Central
- UK Parliament: Aylesbury

Dunsmore is a hamlet in the parish of Ellesborough, in the Buckinghamshire county of South East England. It occupies a hilltop position in the Chiltern Hills, about 2 miles south of Wendover. Access is by two steep, single-track hillside lanes.

The place's name is Anglo-Saxon in origin, and means literally Dunna's moor.

Much of the surrounding land is owned by the National Trust and is heavily wooded with beech trees, and bracken. Due to its elevation the village is occasionally cut off by treacherous road conditions during harsh winters.

Central features of the hamlet are the village pond, the village hall and the Church of the Resurrection, Dunsmore. In the past the village supported a shop and two public houses, The Fox and The Black Horse, but these have now closed and been converted into residential dwellings.

Dunsmore is close by to Chequers, the country retreat for the serving prime minister, and the local Second Boer War memorial on Coombe Hill, Buckinghamshire. The memorial stands above Wendover in the Aylesbury Vale. There are many good, rural walks nearby.

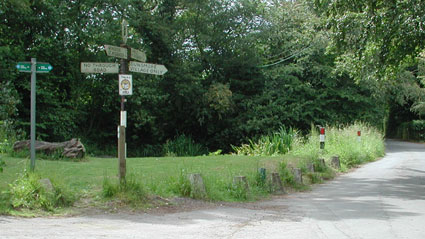
The village pond at Dunsmore.

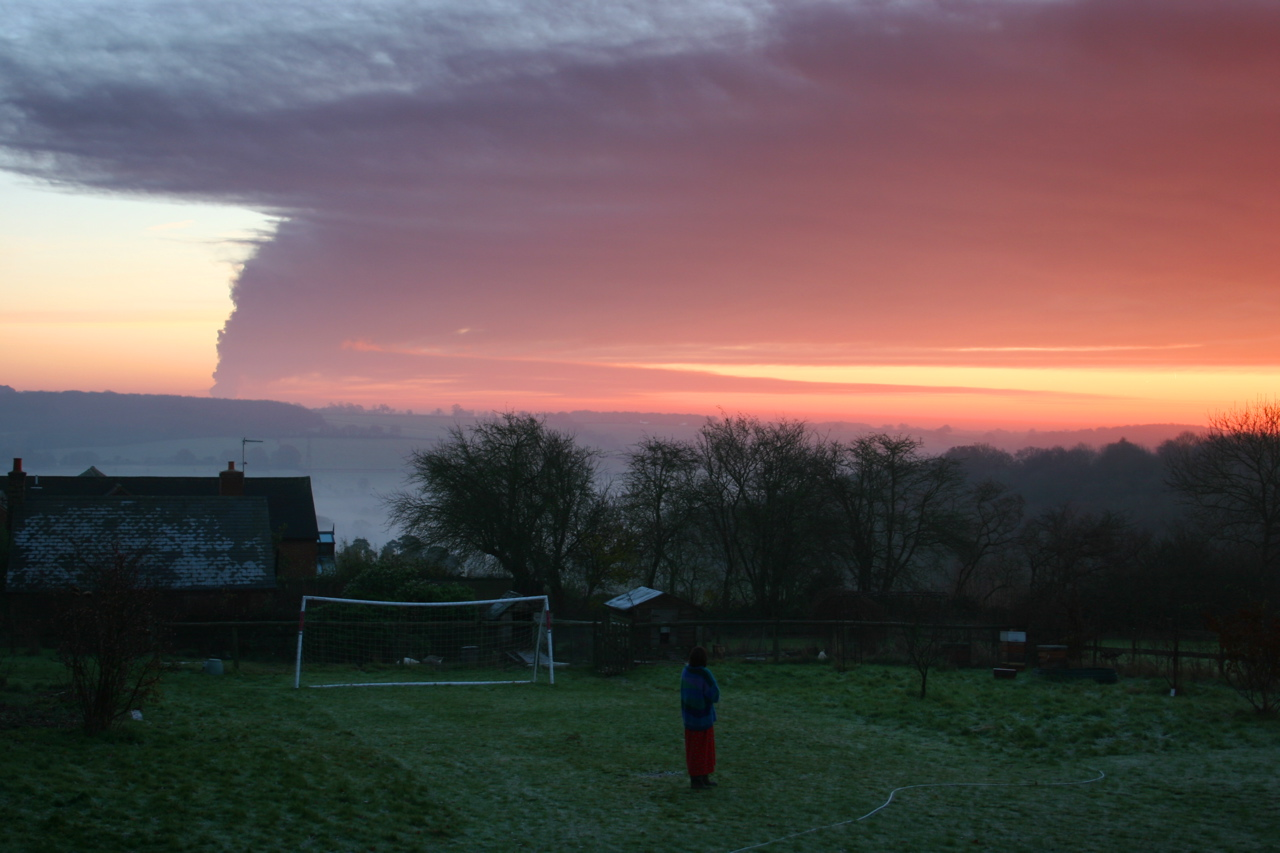
The smoke plume from the 2005 Hertfordshire Oil Storage Terminal fire as seen from Dunsmore, Buckinghamshire, about 14 miles (23 km) away.
