= Butlers Cross =

Hamlet in Buckinghamshire, England

Coordinates: 51.755°N 0.779°W

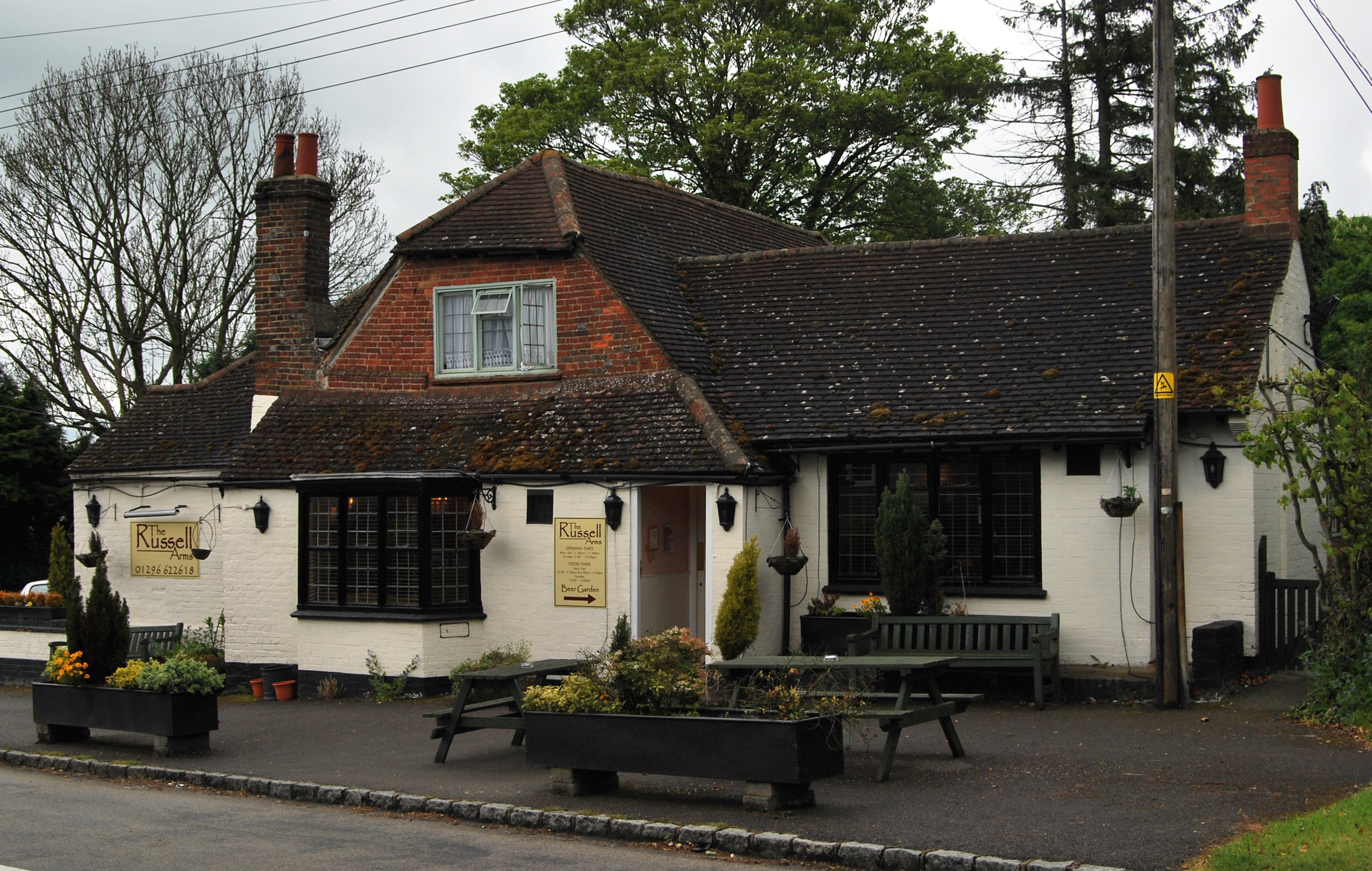
Butlers Cross, Russell Arms

Butlers Cross is a hamlet within the parish of Ellesborough (where the 2011 Census population was included), in Buckinghamshire, England. It is in the south of the parish, at the crossroads between the road from Ellesborough to Little Kimble, and the road from Terrick to the Chequers country house.

The hamlet's name refers to this junction of the two roads, and the fact that this was the place where the Chequers staff and servants normally lived.

On the corner of the junction is a pub called 'The Russell' (formerly the 'Russell Arms'), referring to the family that once owned Chequers. Opposite the pub is a village hall, the Ellesborough Parish Hall, which holds local community events and regular activities such as children's groups, band rehearsals, self-defence and martial arts classes.
