= Boddington Camp =

Hillfort in Buckinghamshire, England

- Boddington Banks
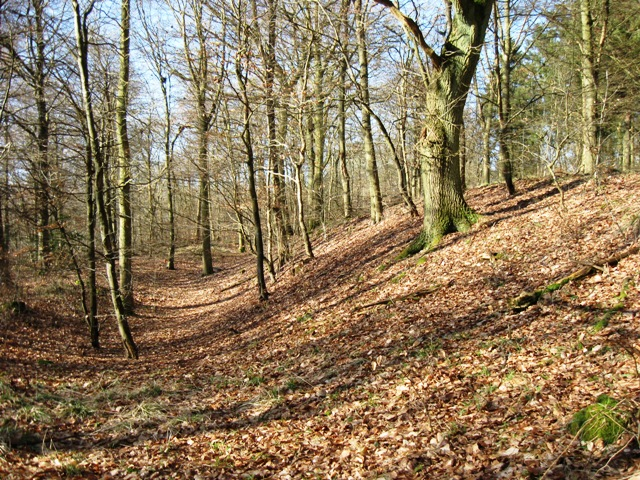
- The bank on the east side, looking south-west

- Location within Buckinghamshire
- 51°45′48″N 0°43′23″W
- Type: Hillfort
- Periods: Iron Age
- OS grid reference: SP 882 079

Site notes
- Area: 6 hectares (15 acres)

Scheduled monument
- Designated: 16 July 1963
- Reference no.: 1011304

Boddington Camp is an Iron Age hillfort, about 1 mile east of Wendover in Buckinghamshire, England. It is a scheduled monument.

== Description ==
The fort is on the summit of Boddington Hill. There is a single rampart and outer ditch, in an oval measuring about 500 by 220 metres (1,640 by 720 ft), oriented north-east to south-west. The interior, area about 6 hectares (15 acres), is heavily wooded. The defences have been destroyed in the north-east, and nothing remains of the probable main entrance here to the fort.

In the south and east, where the defences are most noticeable, the bank is about 1.7 metres (5 ft 7 in) above the interior and up to 3.4 metres (11 ft) above the outer ditch. On the western side, a modern forestry track overlays the outer ditch. At the south-west there is an entrance ramp, thought to be original. A gap on the north-west side is probably modern.

Pottery fragments of the 2nd to the 1st centuries BC were found during an excavation of a section through the rampart near the southern entrance.

== See also ==
- Hillforts in Britain
