= John Colet School =

Location
- Wendover, Buckinghamshire; England; 51.766877°N 0.739388°W

Information
- Type: Academy
- Established: 1956
- Specialist: Humanities College
- Department for Education URN: 137261 Tables
- Ofsted: Reports
- Headteacher: Ian Brierly
- Gender: Co-educational
- Age: 11 to 18
- Enrolment: 1,107 (2024)
- Colour: Maroon
- Website: https://www.johncolet.co.uk/

The John Colet School is a co-educational secondary school in Wendover, Buckinghamshire, England. In August 2011 the school became an Academy.

The school was founded in the 1950s, and is named after churchman and scholar John Colet. In September 2006 the school celebrated its 50th anniversary.

It takes children from the age of 11 through to the age of 18. The school has approximately 1,014 pupils, with approximately 140 students in the sixth form. There are around 60 staff at the school.

A year group is made up of six forms, Amethyst, Citrine, Garnet, Jade, Topaz and Zircon; named after different gemstones.

== Specialist status ==
The school was awarded specialist Humanities College status by the Department for Children, Schools and Families, with effect from September 2008. It specialised in English, History and Religious Education.
