= Ellesborough =

Village in Buckinghamshire, England

Coordinates: 51°45′16″N 0°47′17″W

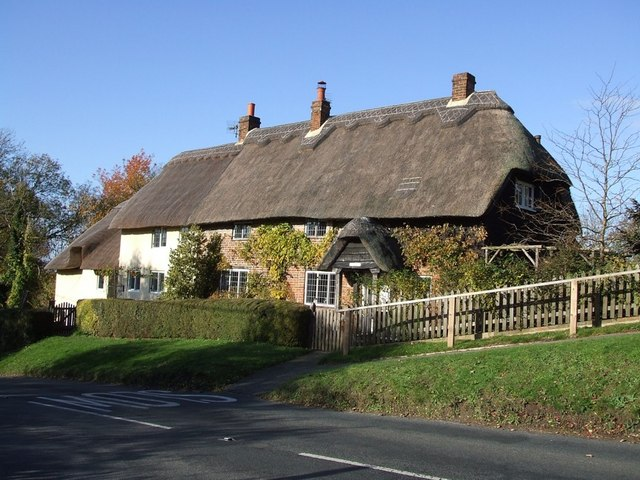
- Ellesborough cottages

- Location within Buckinghamshire
- Population: 820 (2011 Census)
- OS grid reference: SP8306
- Civil parish: Ellesborough
- Unitary authority: Buckinghamshire
- Ceremonial county: Buckinghamshire
- Region: South East
- Country: England
- Sovereign state: United Kingdom
- Post town: AYLESBURY
- Postcode district: HP17
- Dialling code: 01296
- Police: Thames Valley
- Fire: Buckinghamshire
- Ambulance: South Central
- UK Parliament: Mid Buckinghamshire
- Website: Ellesborough Parish Council

Ellesborough is a village and civil parish in Buckinghamshire, England. The village is at the foot of the Chiltern Hills just to the south of the Vale of Aylesbury, two miles (three kilometres) from Wendover and five miles (eight kilometres) from Aylesbury. It lies between Wendover and the village of Little Kimble.

The civil parish includes the hamlets of Butlers Cross, Chalkshire, Dunsmore, North Lee and Terrick, and had a population of 820 at the 2011 Census, an increase from 811 at the 2001 Census.

Close to Ellesborough is the Prime Minister's country residence Chequers.

== History ==
The village's name is probably derived from the Old English for "hill where asses are pastured". This denotes its importance to the nearby settlements known today as The Kimbles and collectively they comprise a typical Chiltern strip parish with Ellesborough containing valuable hill pasture.

In the Domesday Book of 1086 it was recorded as Esenberge. The road from Wendover to Princes Risborough, which makes a very clearly defined detour around the hill on which Ellesborough Church stands, follows the route of the Icknield Way, an ancient trackway used in the Neolithic age (3000 to 1800 BC) which ran from Norfolk to Avebury in Wiltshire.

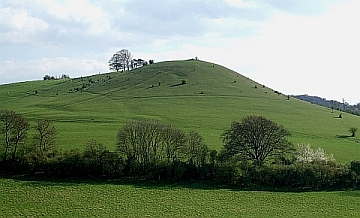
Beacon Hill

Towering over the village is the dominating Beacon Hill, with its grassy mound and lone tree, iconic amongst the Chiltern Hills when viewed from within the Aylesbury Vale. It is also the site of Cymbeline's Mount, also known as Cymbeline's Castle, referred to in the Shakespeare play Cymbeline. In reality, the name refers to the British King Cunobelinus who, alongside his sons, is said to have battled at this site against the Roman Invasion of the British Isles. It is the site of a medieval motte and bailey castle.

== Parish church ==
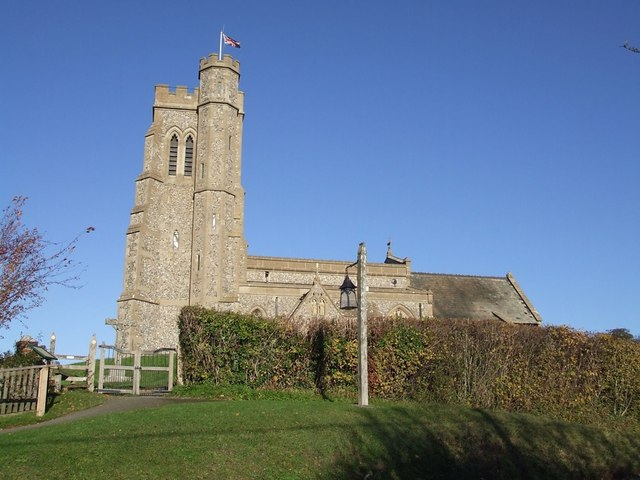
The parish church of St Peter and St Paul

The Church of England parish church of Saints Peter and Paul stands apart from the village, high on the hill overlooking it. The central part of the building dates from the 15th century, with extensions and restoration between 1854 and 1871. It contains 17th century memorials to Sir Robert Croke MP, his son Robert, and their family.

Prime Ministers have often attended this church for Sunday morning worship when in residence at Chequers. Tony Blair, however, followed his wife and children to their Roman Catholic church in Great Missenden. Margaret Thatcher was famously known to have prayed at Ellesborough church during the Falklands War.

== Notable people ==
Lady Isabella Dodd, widow of Sir Samuel Dodd, endowed workhouses in the village in her will in 1722. The Dame Isabella Dodds charity continued until 2004 and gave its name to Dame Isabella Dodds Court in Aylesbury.

Notable people who live in the village include former Formula One world champion racing driver Sir Jackie Stewart and the actor Sir David Jason.
