= The Lee =

Village in Buckinghamshire, England

Coordinates: 51.7299°N 0.6825°W

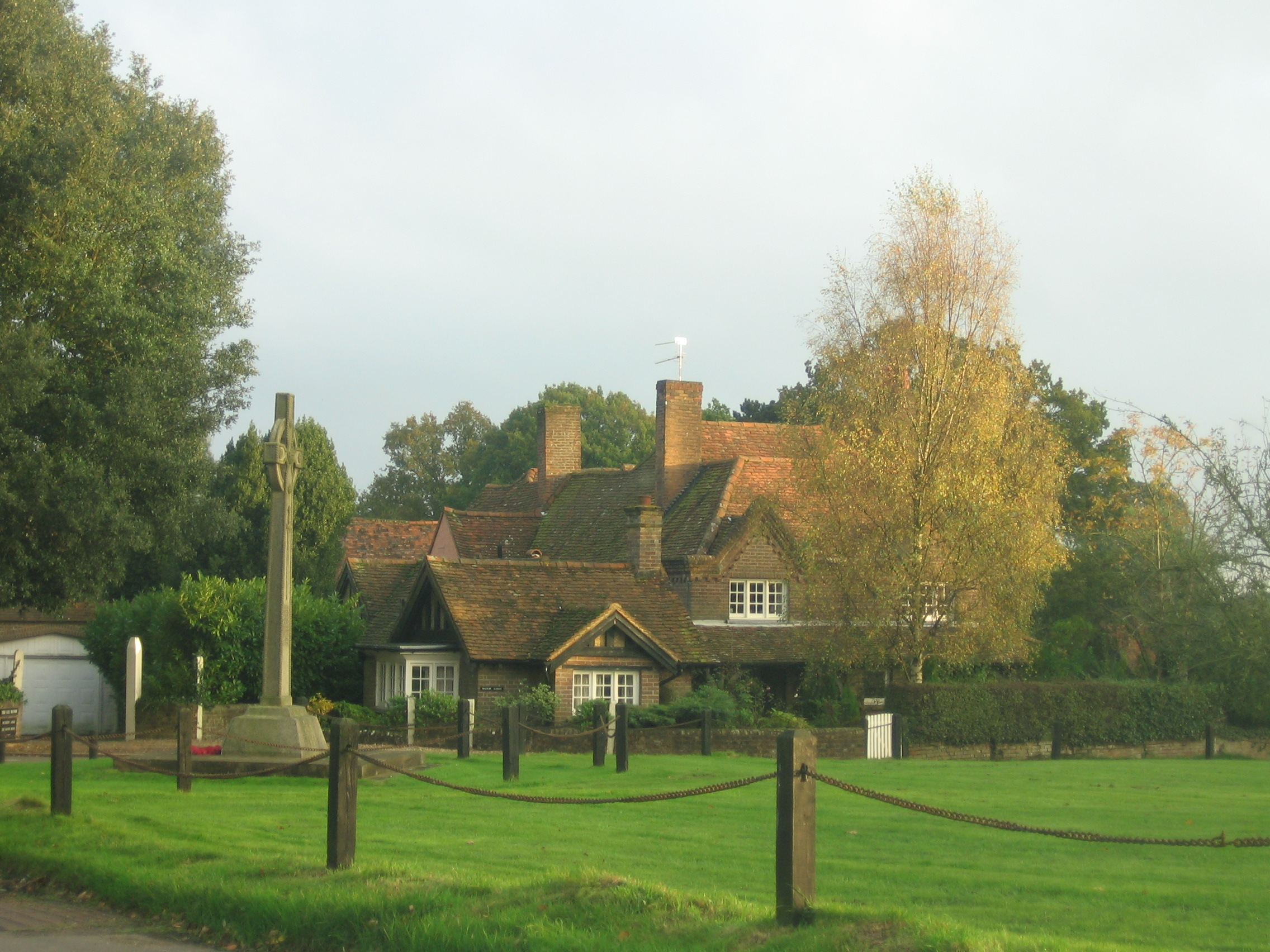
- The Green at The Lee

- Location within Buckinghamshire
- Population: 698 (2011 Census)
- OS grid reference: SP900042
- Civil parish: The Lee
- Unitary authority: Buckinghamshire
- Ceremonial county: Buckinghamshire
- Region: South East
- Country: England
- Sovereign state: United Kingdom
- Post town: GREAT MISSENDEN
- Postcode district: HP16
- Dialling code: 01494
- Police: Thames Valley
- Fire: Buckinghamshire
- Ambulance: South Central
- UK Parliament: Mid Buckinghamshire

The Lee (formally known as just Lee) is a village and civil parish in Buckinghamshire, England. It is located in the Chiltern Hills, about 2 miles (3.2 km) north east of Great Missenden and 3 miles (4.8 km) south east of Wendover. Within the parish is the hamlet of Lee Clump, named for a small group of houses separate from the main village. In 2011 the parish had a population of 698. From 1974 to 2020 it was in Chiltern district.

== Early history ==
The village name is Anglo Saxon in origin and means 'woodland clearing'. In the Domesday Book of 1086 it was recorded as Lee and was, following the Norman Conquest, granted by William I to Odo, Bishop of Bayeux. Its early history is closely tied up with that of Weston Turville and a chapel-of-ease was established in this connection. It and also had associations with the Earl of Leicester who, in the early part of the 12th century, charged Ralph de Halton to oversee the lands. At the end of that century the Turville family took over this role. Soon after this Robert, Earl of Leicester granted the land to Missenden Abbey. After the dissolution of the abbey The Lee stayed in the possession of the Crown until 1547 when Edward VI granted a lease on the estate to John Russell, 1st Earl of Bedford.

The events that led to Francis Russell, 2nd Earl of Bedford initially leasing the lands at The Lee to William Plaistowe in 1635 and later selling the land to the Plaistowe family are obscure; either they were mortgaged to pay off debts or were sequestrated as a consequence of the Russells' involvement on the "wrong" side of the English Civil War. Thomas Plaistowe, who died in 1715, was the first of the family to be the outright owner of The Lee and his namesake in 1785 passed ownership to his daughter Elizabeth, who married Irishman Henry Deering. Deering bequeathed the estate in 1827 to his friend John Peter Gandy, the architect, who changed his name to that of his benefactor. The Plaistowes owned the village for another 50 years.

== Twentieth century ==
In 1900, Arthur Lasenby Liberty bought the manor from John Plaistowe and built a new manor house on the outskirts of the village. The old manor house became three attached properties which remain so today. Outside the new manor house he sited a figurehead depicting Admiral Richard Howe taken from HMS Howe. The figurehead was moved to outside Pipers where the family moved in 1953.

The ship, which had subsequently been renamed Impregnable, was scrapped by the Royal Navy in 1919, and purchased by Liberty in 1926. He used the timbers of this ship to refurbish, in Tudor revivalist style, the interior and frontage of his famed Liberty's department store in central London. The Liberty family still live at The Lee.

== Churches ==
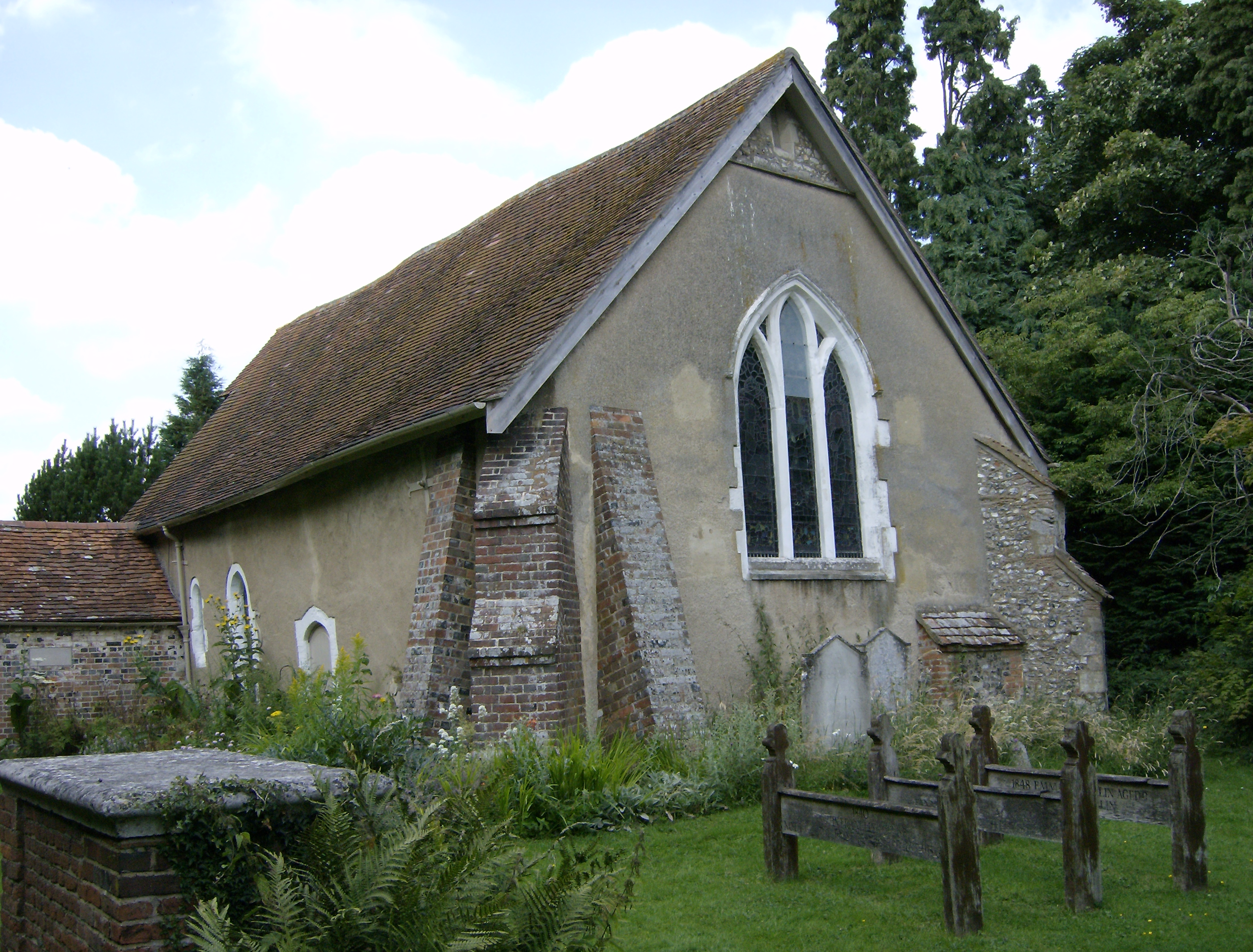
The 'Old Church' at The Lee

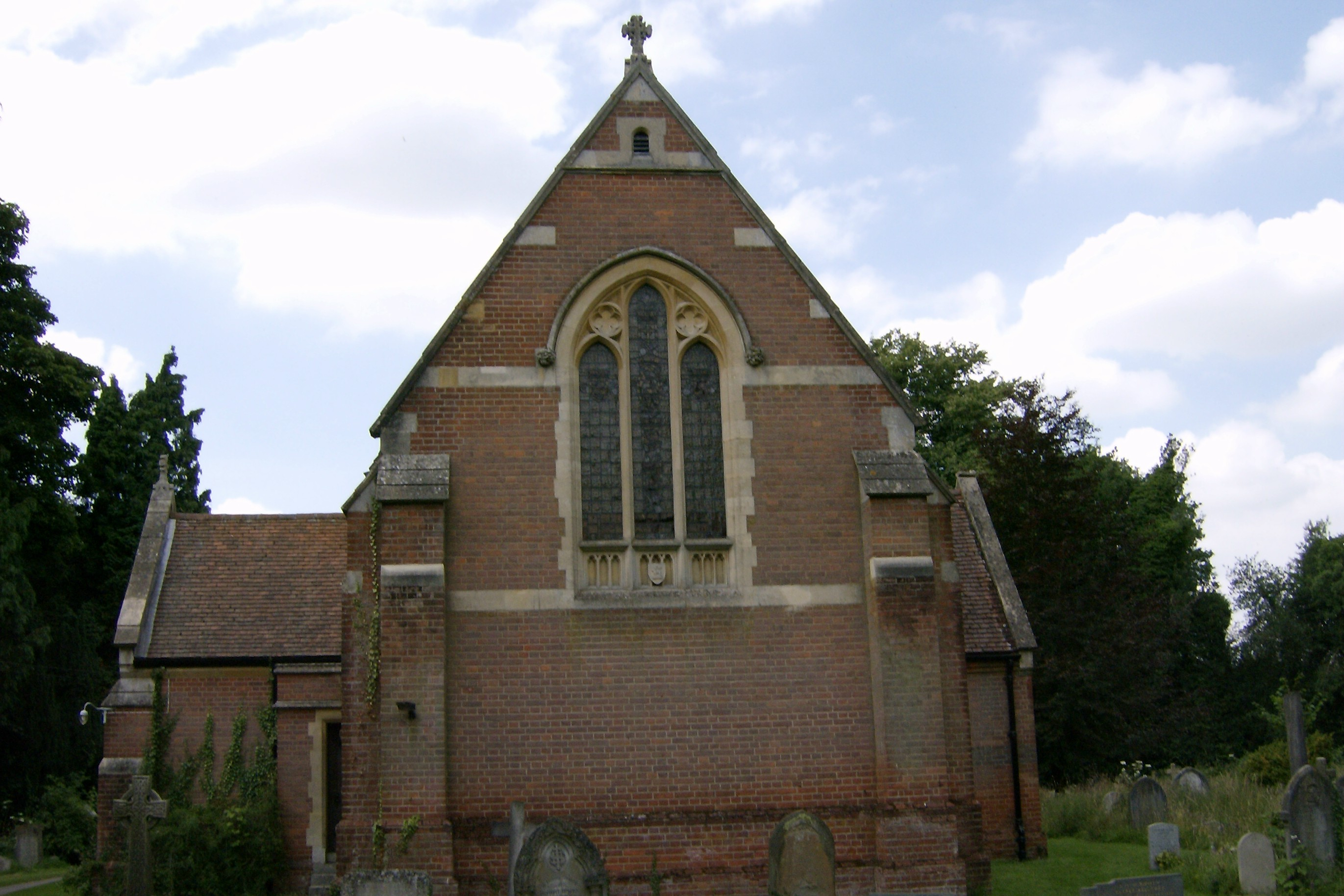
St John the Baptist Church, The Lee

The parish church in the village St John the Baptist is unusual in that it consists of two buildings: the ancient chapel of ease built in the 12th century which includes a window depicting Oliver Cromwell and John Hampden as 'champions of liberty', and the more modern Victorian construction that was built of red brick in 1867. Both sit within an oval churchyard, common in places of importance in the pre-Roman period.

There is a Methodist chapel at Lee Common, which was built in 1839 as a Primitive Methodist chapel. It is one of the oldest Methodist chapels in Bucks. There is a small churchyard attached to it. The Methodist church is part of the Amersham Methodist Circuit.

Formerly there was also a Strict Baptist chapel at Lee Clump, and Mission Halls at Swan Bottom and Potter Row.

== Hamlets ==
Hamlets in the parish of The Lee include Lee Clump, Lee Common, Lee Gate, Hunt's Green, Potter Row and Swan Bottom.

== Locations ==
The village has been used as the backdrop for a number of television programmes including several episodes of Midsomer Murders.
