= Wendover =

Town in Buckinghamshire, England

Coordinates: 51°46′03″N 00°44′42″W

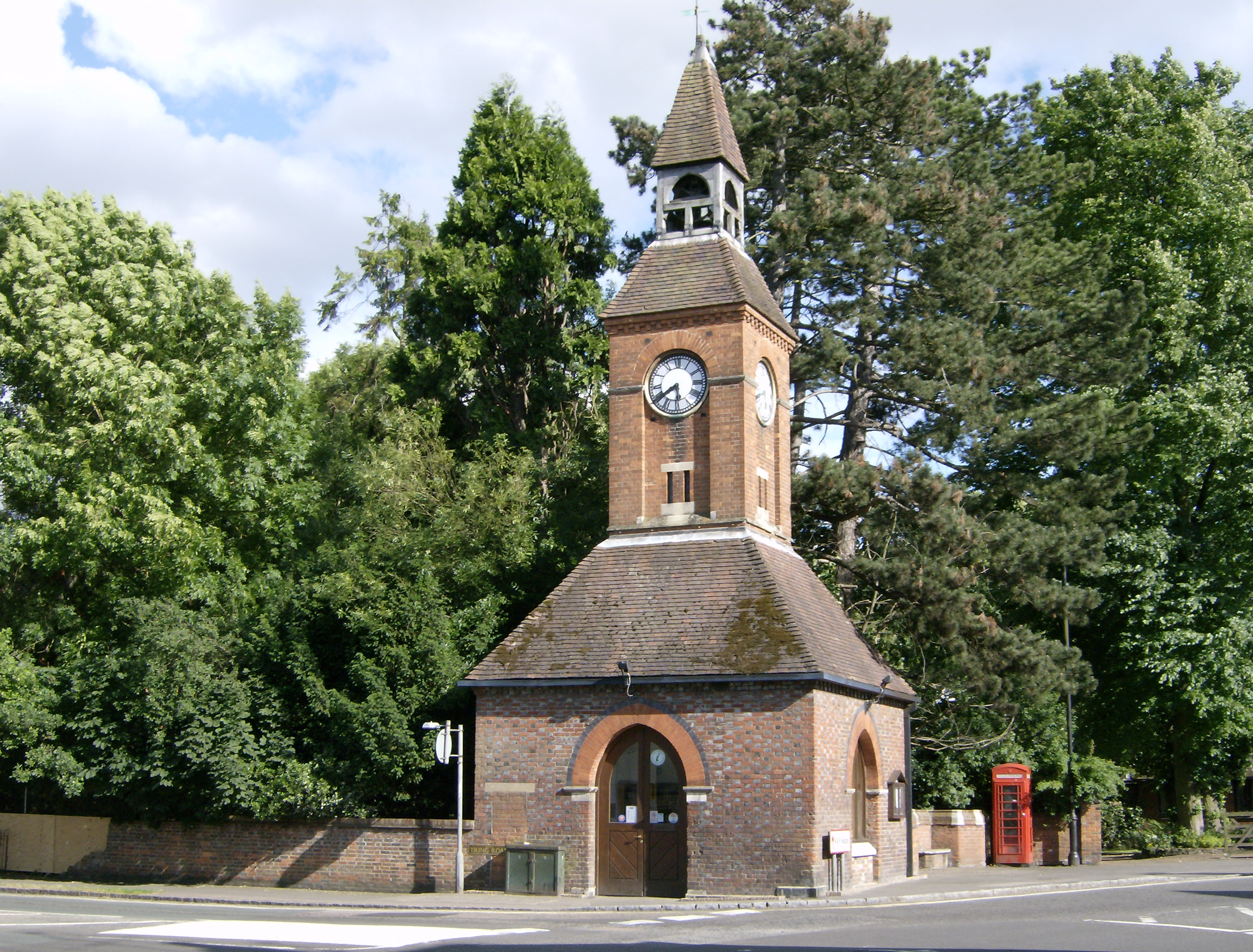
- The Clock Tower, Wendover

- Location within Buckinghamshire
- Area: 9.1125 sq mi (23.601 km^{2})
- Population: 7,399 (2011 Census)
  - Density: 812/sq mi (314/km^{2})
- OS grid reference: SP864085
- Civil parish: Wendover
- Unitary authority: Buckinghamshire
- Ceremonial county: Buckinghamshire
- Region: South East
- Country: England
- Sovereign state: United Kingdom
- Post town: AYLESBURY
- Postcode district: HP22
- Dialling code: 01296
- Police: Thames Valley
- Fire: Buckinghamshire
- Ambulance: South Central
- UK Parliament: Mid Buckinghamshire
- Website: Wendover Parish Council

Wendover is a town (Note: Wendover is occasionally referred to as a village; for example, the Wendover conservation area appraisal states "Although Wendover identifies itself as a village, and is maintained by a Parish rather than a Town Council, the history of the settlement is very much that of a small market town.") and civil parish at the foot of the Chiltern Hills in Buckinghamshire, England. It is situated at the point where the main road across the Chilterns between London and Aylesbury intersects with the once important road along the foot of the hill. The town lies 35 miles (56 km) north-west of London and 5 miles (8 km) south-east of Aylesbury.

The parish has an area of 5,832 acres (2,360 ha) and had, at the time of the 2011 census, a population of 7,399. Outside Wendover, the parish is mainly arable and also contains several hamlets in the surrounding hills. Wendover has a weekly market and has had a market charter since 1464.

== Etymology ==
The name is likely of Brythonic Celtic origin. The initial part of the name could be related to wyn or gwyn, as in modern Welsh, meaning white. The second part of the name "dwr" could derive from "dwfr" meaning "water". The Brythonic ancestor to the Welsh "dwr" is also the etymology of the city of Dover.

== History ==
The first known documentary reference to Wendover, then known as Wændofron, is in the will of Ælfheah, the ealdorman of Hampshire, and dates from between 965 and 971. Prior to the Norman Conquest, the manor, which at the time measured 24 hides in area, was held by Edward the Confessor. The settlement appears to have been centred some 600 metres (2,000 ft) to the south of the present-day focus of the town, near the current location of the parish church of St Mary. By 1086, the manor of Wendovre was in the hundred of Aylesbury, with William the Conqueror as its tenant in chief.

The manor remained in royal ownership until 1154, and then passed back and forth between royal and private ownership several times. Wendover was granted a market charter in 1214, and had become a borough by 1228, although it does not appear to have achieved any degree of self-government. It is likely that around this time the focus moved north to its current location, allowing the market to cater to traffic on the road running along the Chilterns between Chinnor and Tring, as well as that crossing the Chilterns between London and Aylesbury. The current layout of the older parts of the town show clear signs of medieval town planning, especially the presence of long, narrow and rectilinear burgage plots.

Both parliamentary and royalist forces visited the town during the Civil War, with looting reported by both sides. Many of the buildings in the town centre, and especially on High Street, Pound Street, and Aylesbury Road, date from the 17th century. It is not known whether this is because they needed rebuilding after civil war damage, or is an indication of the prosperity of the town at the time.

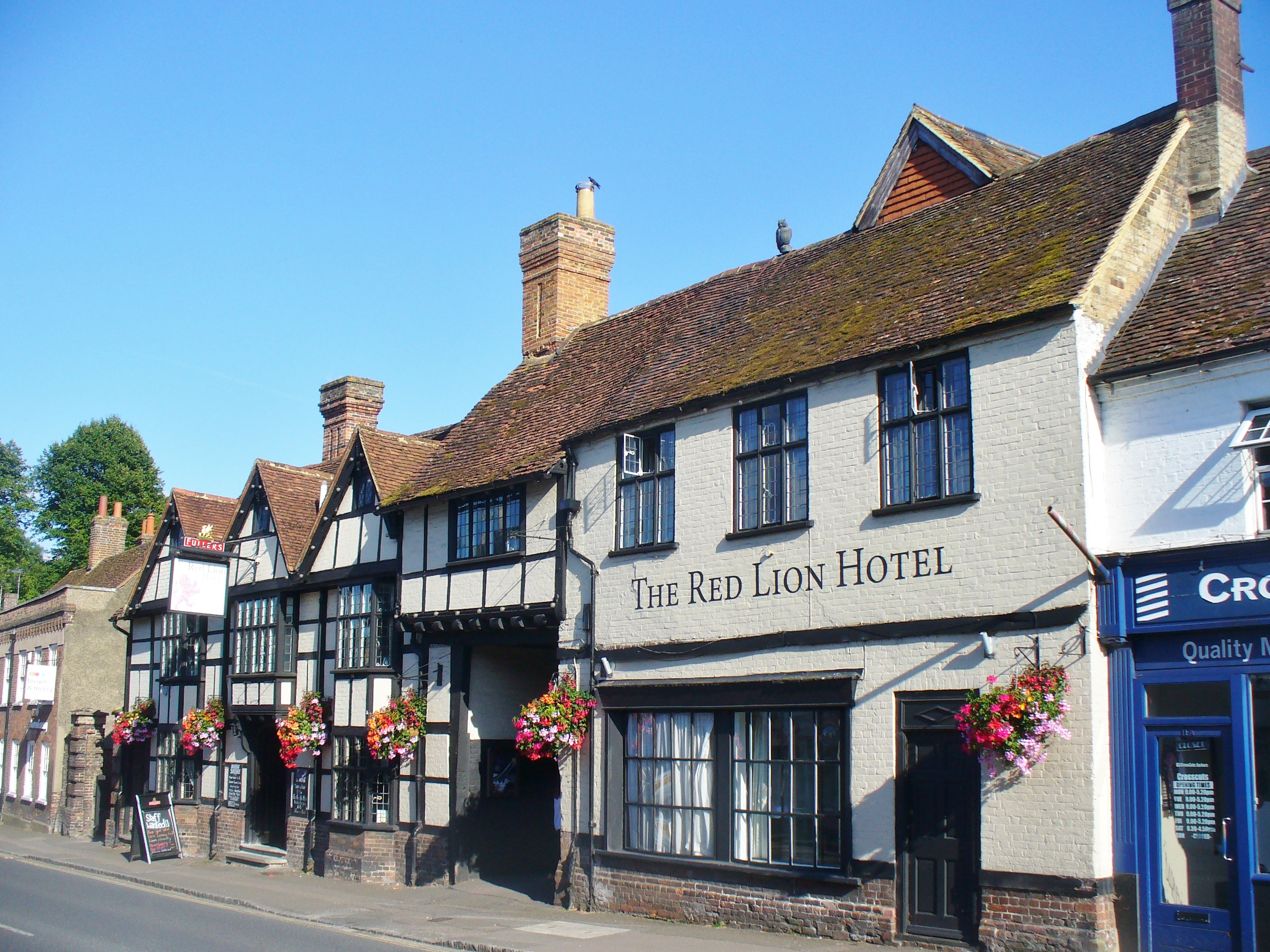
The Red Lion, one of Wendover's old coaching inns on the High Street

In 1721, the Wendover to Buckingham Turnpike Trust was established, and Wendover became a stop for coach routes to and from London. It is likely that at this time a number of new inns and hostelries were built along the High Street. The Wendover Arm of the Grand Union Canal was built between 1793 and 1797 and served local industries whilst also providing a water supply for the parent canal. In September 1892, the railway reached the town with the opening of Wendover railway station on the Metropolitan Railway's line to Aylesbury. Responsibility for the station was transferred from London Transport, who had inherited it from the Metropolitan Railway, to British Railways, in 1961.

The 1841 census reveal the population that year was 1,877.

Robert Louis Stevenson, the writer of famous works such as Treasure Island and the Strange Case of Dr Jekyll and Mr Hyde, stayed a night at The Red Lion, in October 1874, which he wrote about in an essay called "An Autumn Effect".

In 1913 Alfred de Rothschild invited the Royal Flying Corps to conduct manoeuvres on his land in the adjacent manor of Halton, and the land continued to be used by the British Army throughout the First World War. In 1916 the Royal Flying Corps moved its air mechanics school from Farnborough, Hampshire to Halton, and in 1917, the school was permanently accommodated there, in what was to become the current RAF Halton. Whilst the base is not in the parish of Wendover, its close proximity impacted on the town, and the surrounding landscape, due to the associated population increases and deforestation to provide wood for construction work.

In the latter part of the twentieth century, a number of large scale residential developments appeared, particularly to the north of the town. In 1998, the Wendover bypass was built, moving the A413 road west of the town centre, paralleling the railway line. Property values rose significantly in the years after the completion of the bypass, which removed a lot of traffic from the town's narrow streets. In 2010, the proposed route the High Speed 2 rail line (HS2) from London to the Midlands was published, showing it taking a route in tunnel to the west of the bypass and town centre. As part of a wider campaign against the route, a Wendover lobby group was formed, with a 300 strong protest filmed by the BBC in December 2010. However, despite the opposition, the HS2 bill was passed in 2016. In 2017, construction contracts were signed.

In 2019, the Wendover community launched WRAP (Wendover Resettlement Assistance Project), a project in partnership with CitizensUK.

== Geography ==
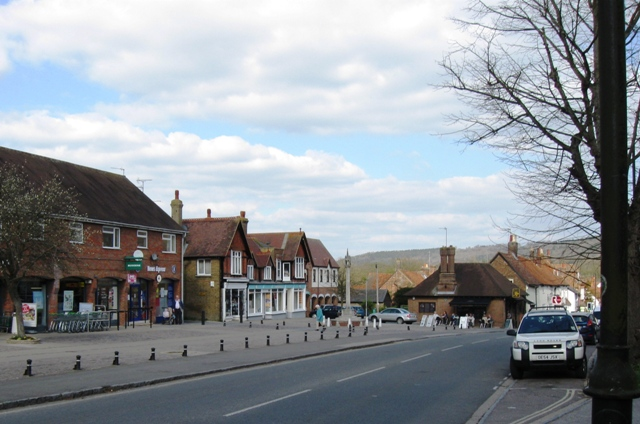
The market place in Wendover, with the Chiltern escarpment and Wendover Woods beyond

Wendover lies at approximately 130 metres (430 ft) above sea level. It occupies a prime position at the northern end of a natural crossing point through the Chiltern Hills, which wrap around the west, south and east of the town. To the north the land slopes gently downwards towards the flat, agricultural land of the Aylesbury Vale. To the west the town is overlooked by Coombe Hill (260 metres or 850 feet) and to the east by Wendover Woods (267 metres or 876 feet).

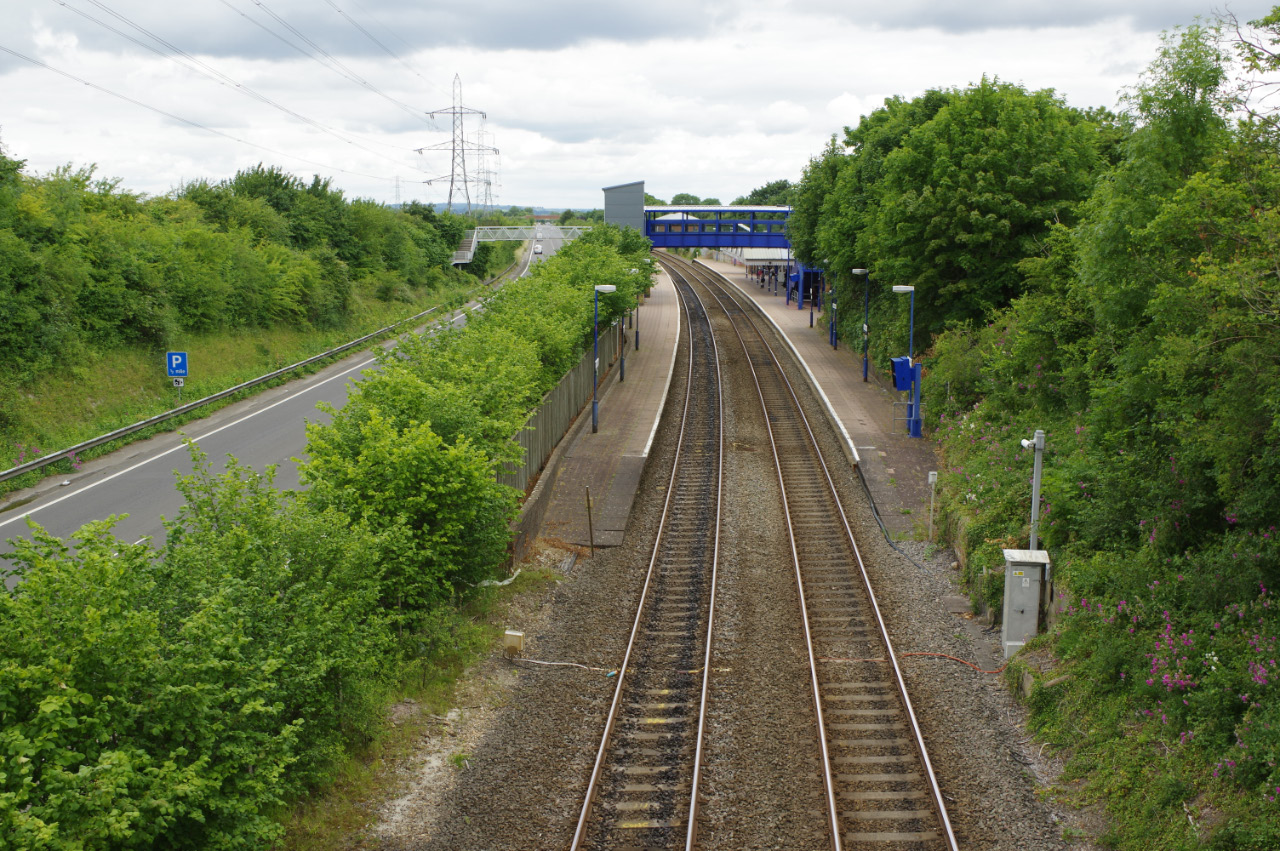
The bypass and railway station to the west of Wendover and looking north; the new High Speed 2 rail link will be in a tunnel further to the left

The gap through the Chilterns that Wendover sits astride has long been an important communications route. It is used by the A413 road between London and Aylesbury, the London to Aylesbury railway line, and the new high speed rail link between London and the North that is now under construction. At Wendover this route is crossed by the route of the ancient Icknield Way, running along the line of the Chilterns, that has connected Wiltshire to Norfolk since prehistoric times.

Besides the town itself, the civil parish includes the hamlets of:

- Dean, located south of Wendover on Smalldean Lane between the hamlets of Smalldean and Little London.
- Kings Ash or Kingsash, located south-south east of Wendover on the Chesham Lane between the A413 road and the hamlet of Lee Gate.
- Little London, located south of Wendover on Smalldean Lane between the hamlet of Dean and the village of Dunsmore.
- Lower Bacombe, located south of Wendover on the lane between the main town and Upper Bacombe.
- Smalldean, located south of Wendover on Smalldean Lane, between the southernmost roundabout of the Wendover bypass and the hamlet of Dean.
- The Hale, located east of Wendover along Hale Lane.
- Upper Bacombe, located south-south west of Wendover on Bacombe Hill, close of the parish boundary.
- Wendover Dean, located south of Wendover on the A413 road, between Cobblershill Lane and Bowood Lane.

== Governance ==
Wendover was represented by its own parliamentary constituency, intermittently from 1300 and continuously from 1660, until the seat was abolished by the Reform Act of 1832. Since 2024 the town and parish have formed a part of the Mid Buckinghamshire constituency, represented by Greg Smith of the Conservative Party.

There are two tiers of local government covering Wendover, at parish and unitary authority level: Wendover Parish Council and Buckinghamshire Council. The parish council is based at the Clock Tower on High Street.

== Economy ==
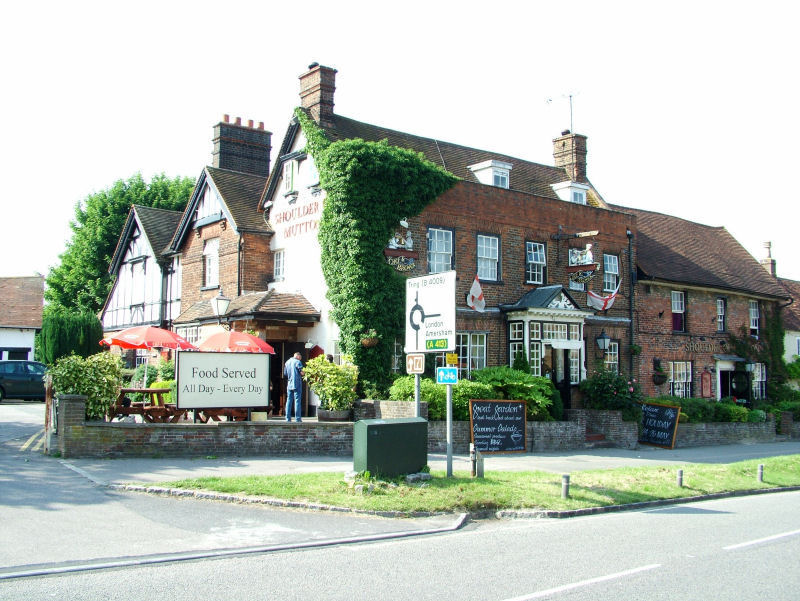
The Shoulder of Mutton public house

Facilities in the town centre include a post office, several hairdressers, a community library (run by volunteers), multiple delis and cafés, two charity shops, a book shop and a pharmacy. There is a weekly open market on Thursdays.

Wendover's pubs include The Red Lion, The George & Dragon, The White Swan, The King and Queen, The Pack Horse, and The Shoulder of Mutton. The Red Lion pub was home to 'Britain's Oldest Barmaid', 100-year-old Dolly Saville, who worked at the pub for 74 years.

== Education ==
There are four schools in the town:

- The John Hampden School, named after politician and English Civil War participant John Hampden, a community infant school with about 275 pupils aged 4–7,
- Wendover Church of England Junior School, a voluntary controlled junior school with about 360 pupils aged 7–11,
- The John Colet School, named after the Renaissance humanist John Colet, a community secondary school with about 1100 pupils aged 11–18,
- The Wendover campus of the Chiltern Way Academy, a special school for pupils aged 11–18.

== Landmarks ==
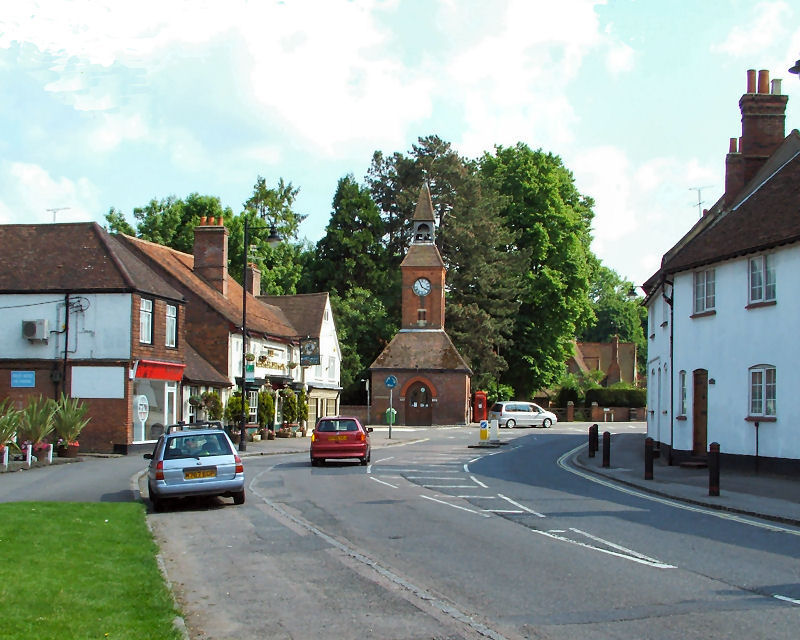
View of Wendover Clock Tower from Aylesbury Rd

There are 113 listed buildings in Wendover, of which five are listed at the higher grade II* and the remainder are all listed at grade II. The five grade II* buildings are the parish church, the lychgate of that church, Bank Farmhouse, the Hale and the Red House.

There is a distinctive red brick, spired clock tower at the junction of High Street and Tring Road in the centre of the town, built in 1842. The ground floor of the tower serves as the office of the parish council. The tree-lined Aylesbury Street includes the 16th-century timber framed Chiltern House and 18th-century Red House.

To the north of the town centre is the terminus of the Wendover Arm of the Grand Union Canal, which joins Tring summit level of the Grand Union main line beside Marsworth top lock. Disused for over a century, the arm is in the course of being restored by the Wendover Arm Trust. Remote and rural for almost all its length, the canal attracts much local wildlife, including a colony of mandarin ducks. It is possible to walk along the canal for about 5 miles (8.0 km) from the centre of Wendover, to Tring.

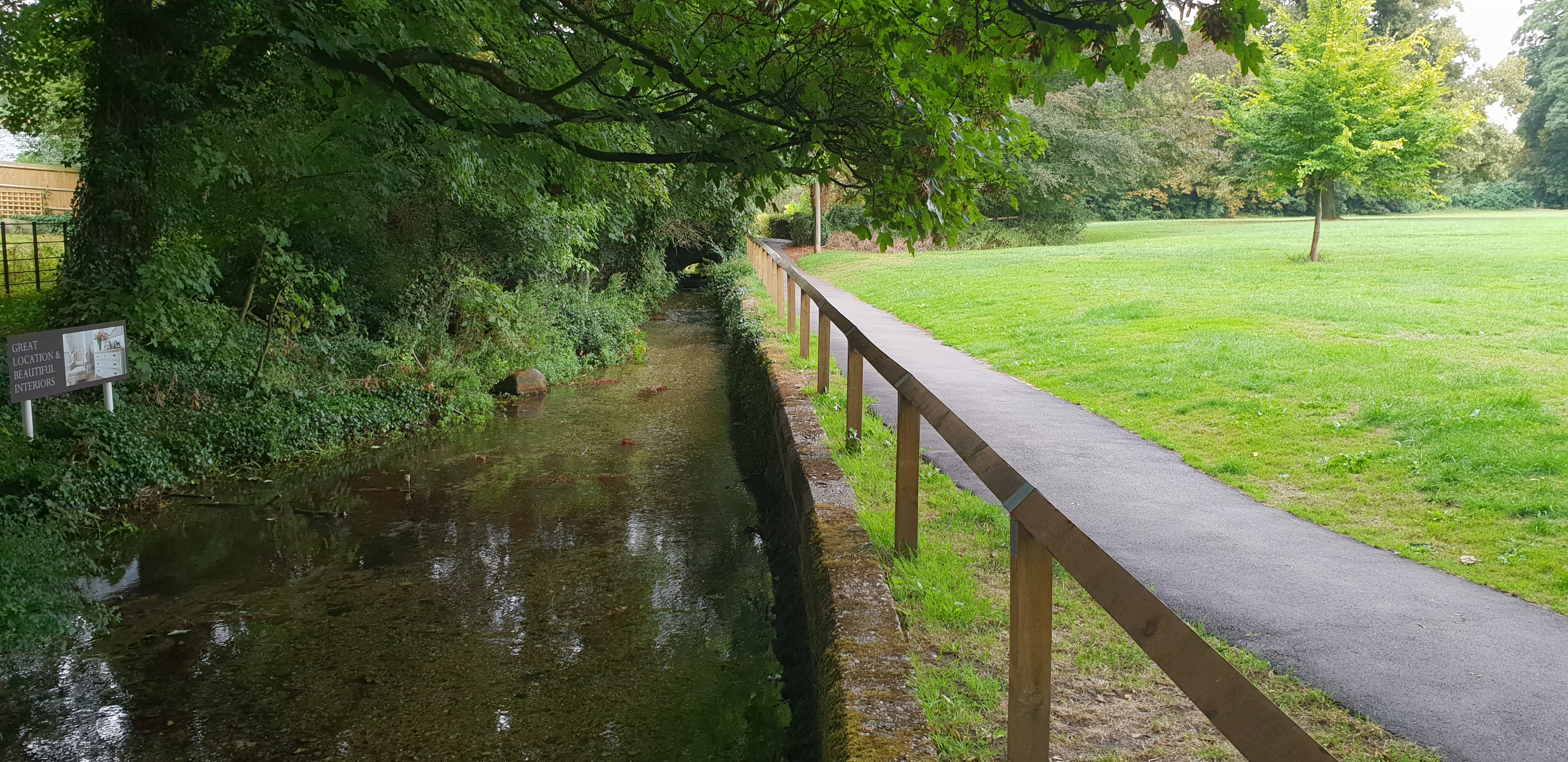
Heron Stream and Witchell Meadow

To the south of town centre lie the open spaces of Witchell Meadow, Hampden Meadow and Rope Walk Meadow, the latter hosting the new Wendover Community Orchard in memory of the First World War. These are bounded to the east by the Heron Stream and to the south by Hampden Pond, both feeders to the canal. On the southern side of the pond lies Wendover's parish church, which is dedicated to St Mary, and which marks the site of the original settlement.

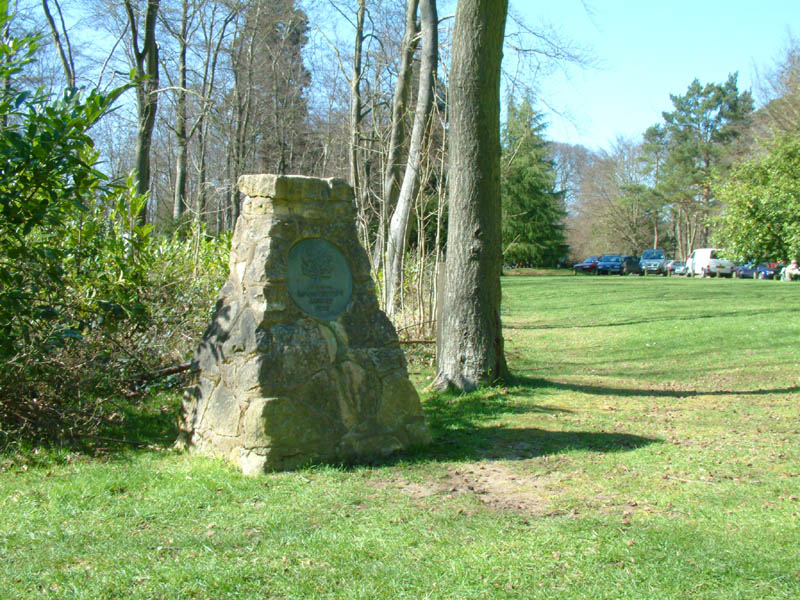
Wendover Woods

The town is sited in a gap in the Chiltern Hills and a designated Area of Outstanding Natural Beauty. The ancient Ridgeway National Trail, an 85-mile walking route from Avebury to Ivinghoe, passes along Wendover High Street. Apart from the Ridgeway Trail there are 33 miles of public rights of way and bridleways criss-crossing the parish and leading to the open chalk downland of Coombe Hill, Buckinghamshire, home to Britain's longest surviving geocache, and a monument to the Buckinghamshire men who died in the Boer War. Wendover Woods on Haddington Hill and Boddington Hill belong to Forest Enterprise England. There are routes for mountain bikers, and walking trails for walkers of various abilities as well as barbecue sites and play areas for children. On Boddington Hill are the remains of an Iron Age hill fort, Boddington Camp.

Wendover and the surrounding villages including Aston Clinton, Ellesborough and Weston Turville, are widely regarded as exceptionally desirable places to reside and the town was named one of the best places to live in Britain by The Sunday Times in 2018.

== Transport ==
Wendover railway station is served by Chiltern Railways services between London Marylebone and Aylesbury Vale Parkway on the London to Aylesbury Line.

Wendover has four bus routes passing through it: the 50 travels between Aylesbury and RAF Halton, the 55 travels between Aylesbury and Chesham, and the 55A and 55B travel between Aylesbury and Chesham including Tring. All routes are run by Red Rose Travel.

== Media ==
Local news and television programmes are BBC South and ITV Meridian. Television signals are received from the Oxford TV transmitter.

Local radio stations are BBC Three Counties Radio, Heart East (formerly 97.6 Chiltern FM), Greatest Hits Radio Bucks, Beds and Herts (formerly Mix 96) and Red Kite Radio, a community based radio station that broadcast from Aylesbury.

The town is served by the local newspapers, Bucks Herald, Bucks Free Press and Wendover News.

== Sport ==
Wendover Football Club currently shares the school fields of the John Colet School and a clubhouse is open each Saturday afternoon for either a first or a reserve team fixture.

Wendover hosts the 'Coombe Hill Run', usually held on the first Sunday in June. It begins and ends in the town and includes two very steep climbs up the hill to the monument along with a very steep decline.

Wendover Cricket Club played at Ellesborough Road Ground, however, this site lay in the path of High Speed 2. The club will move to a new premises, funded by HS2 Ltd, soon in the future.

== Notable people ==
- Iain Lee (1973), former broadcaster, writer, and television presenter and stand-up comedian
- Thomas Barlow (1845–1945), physician
- Pete Hobbs and Jof Owen from The Boy Least Likely To, indie pop duo
- Edmund Burke (1729–1797), member of parliament
- Gordon Onslow Ford (1912–2003), artist
- David Jason (born 1940), actor
- John Junkin (1930–2006), actor and scriptwriter
- Katie Malliff (born 2003), professional squash player
- James Marriott (born 1997), musician
- Geoffrey Palmer (1927–2020), actor
- Cecilia Payne-Gaposchkin (1900–1979), astronomer and astrophysicist
- Margaret Rawlings (1906–1996), actress
- Michael Shrimpton (born 1957), barrister
- Roger of Wendover (?–1236), chronicler

== Twin town ==
Wendover is twinned with Liffré, in Brittany, France.
