= Cymbeline's Castle =

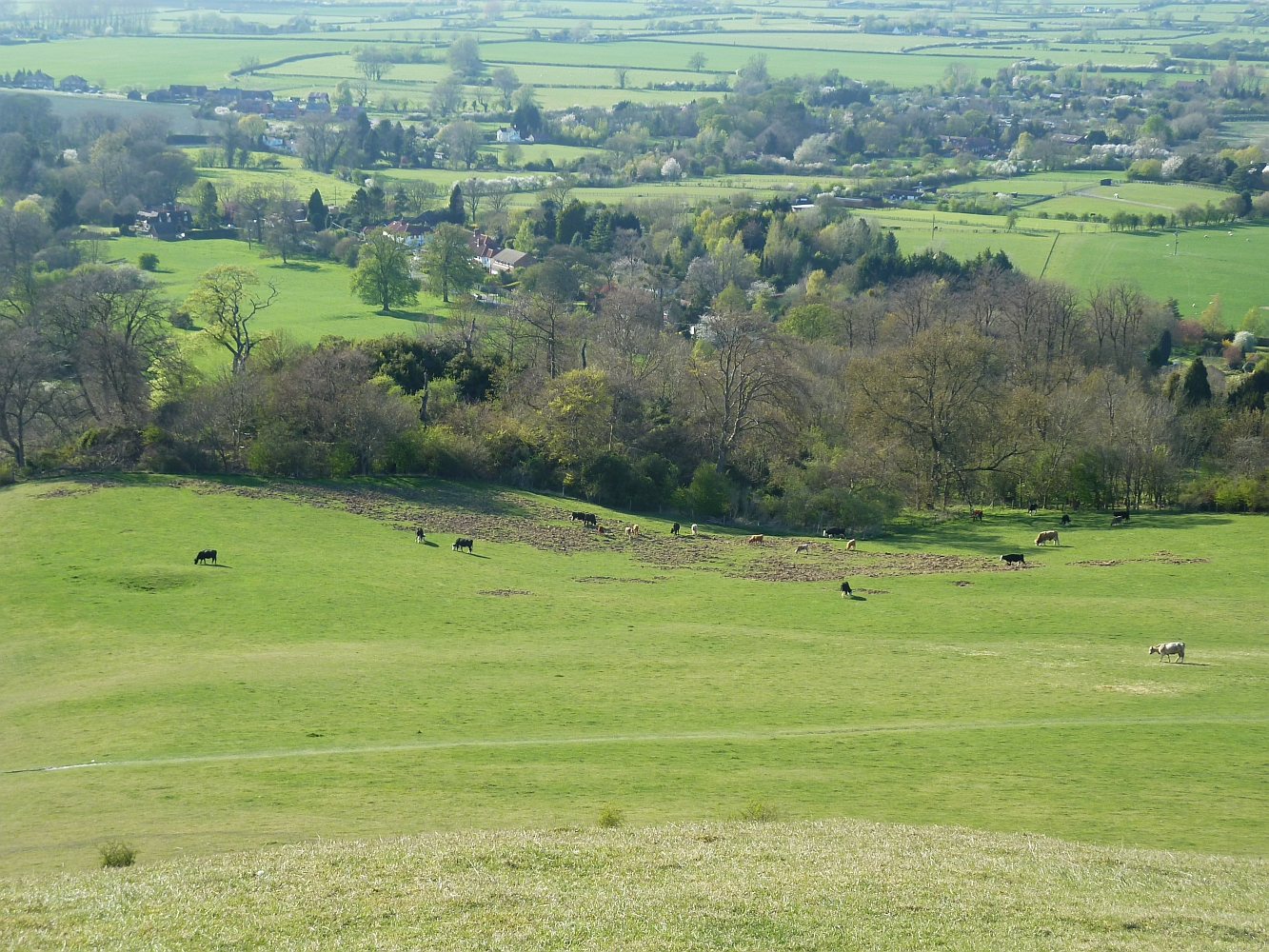
- Cymbeline's Castle and Little Kimble

Highest point
- Coordinates: 51.7495°N 0.7954°W

Geography
- Location: Great Kimble, Buckinghamshire
- OS grid: SP 83265 06350

Cymbeline's Castle, also known as Cymbeline's Mound and Belinus's Castle, is the remains of a motte-and-bailey castle in woods north-east of Great Kimble in Buckinghamshire, England. It is scheduled under the Ancient Monuments and Archaeological Areas Act 1979.

The motte is about 42 metres (138 ft) in diameter and encircled on three sides by a ditch, outside which lie two additional baileys. Within the baileys have been found pottery fragments of the 13th–15th centuries, and Iron Age and Romano-British fragments have been recovered to the east of the remains. A short distance to the west are remains of another motte-and-bailey castle, along with a moated enclosure and a Roman villa.

The name associates it with the ancient British king Cunobeline (Cymbeline), although this may be a Victorian invention. (There is also a theory that the nearby villages of Great Kimble, Little Kimble and Kimble Wick are named after Cymbeline; however, this has been discredited, as the etymology of Kimble is a description of the hill rather than a name.)

It is said that if one runs around this mound seven times, the devil will appear.
