= Terrick =

Hamlet in Buckinghamshire, England

Coordinates: 51.765°N 0.783°W

Terrick (formerly Terwick) is a hamlet in the parish of Ellesborough, in Buckinghamshire, England. It is located in the north of the parish, where the lane leading to Chequers meets the main road from Stoke Mandeville to Little Kimble.

The hamlet name is Anglo Saxon in origin, and means 'Teofer's farm'.

== Contemporary ==
Today the community of Terrick is small, but close-knit.

Terrick is the location of the Chiltern Brewery Company, who have operated in the hamlet for over thirty years. They were an early microbrewery, established in 1980. Their Chiltern Ale is considered one of the world's best craft beers. The hamlet name lends itself to Terrick Truckle, a cheese that they produce.

Terrick Beef, traditional English meat, is produced by a local farmer.

In 2018, a local man stole £33,500 from an elderly man; the perpetrator was convicted and jailed after the victim died.
