= A4010 road =

Road in Buckinghamshire, England

Coordinates: 51.70264°N 0.83262°W

A4010

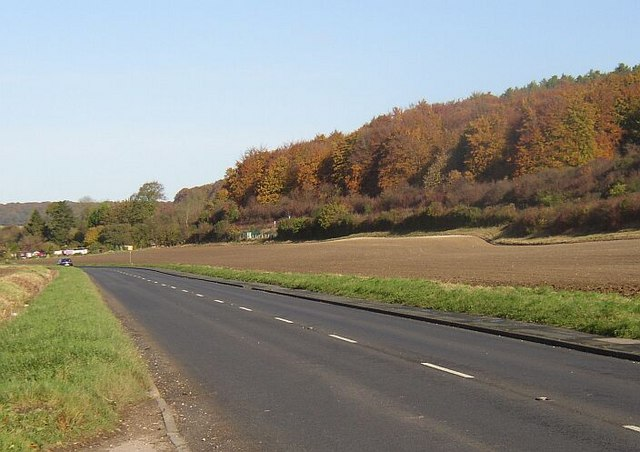
- The A4010 between West Wycombe and Aylesbury

Route information
- Length: 17 mi (27 km)

Major junctions
- South end: Handy Cross Roundabout, High Wycombe
- M40 A404; A40 A4129 A413
- North end: Stoke Mandeville

Location
- Country: United Kingdom
- Primary destinations: Aylesbury, Princes Risborough

Road network
- Roads in the United Kingdom; Motorways; A and B road zones
← A4008	→ A4012

The A4010 is an important primary north–south road in Buckinghamshire, Southern England. It runs from High Wycombe at Junction 4 of the M40 motorway to Stoke Mandeville, near Aylesbury on the A413.

== Route ==
=== High Wycombe ===
The A4010 begins at the major junction at Handy Cross where the A404 meets the M40 motorway. It travels through the High Wycombe suburbs of Cressex and Sands to West Wycombe Road where it meets the A40 road. The two roads then combine for 0.5 miles (0.8 km) to the Pedestal roundabout, where they split.

=== Princes Risborough ===
The A4010 then runs as Bradenham Road, crossing under the Chiltern Main Line by means of a distinctive brick skew bridge and closely following it through Bradenham and Saunderton to Princes Risborough. The road travels straight through the town centre, meeting the A4129 at a roundabout. It then turns north-east through Monks Risborough.

=== Stoke Mandeville ===
The A4010 then travels through The Kimbles, (the villages of Great Kimble and Little Kimble). The road then comes out of the Chiltern Hills and, at a roundabout, turns north. 1 mile (1.6 km) later, it enters Stoke Mandeville. After passing another roundabout and Stoke Mandeville railway station, the road terminates at a roundabout on the A413. The A413 then carries on north-west into central Aylesbury.

== Railway ==
The A4010 generally stays very close to the Chiltern Main Line from West Wycombe to Princes Risborough and then the Princes Risborough to Aylesbury Line from Princes Risborough to Little Kimble. The road passes the following stations:

- Saunderton
- Princes Risborough
- Monks Risborough
- Little Kimble
- Stoke Mandeville (which is on the London to Aylesbury Line)

== Present situation ==
The A4010 has an important role to fulfil in connecting, Aylesbury the county town of Buckinghamshire to High Wycombe, the largest town in south Buckinghamshire. However, the road is not dual carriageway at all throughout its 17-mile (27 km) trip. It also travels right through the centres of High Wycombe, Princes Risborough and Stoke Mandeville with no bypasses. Because of this, the road is often congested especially in the rush hours. Additionally, the road comes very close to Aylesbury without actually reaching it. Access to Aylesbury is via a small mini roundabout with the A413, itself also a single carriageway. This junction is exceptionally small for the traffic flow it serves in all three directions. There is an alternative route into Aylesbury, via the B4443, which leaves the A4010 a little further west, also by way of a mini roundabout. This route takes traffic past the front of the busy Stoke Mandeville Hospital.

== Future ==
=== Princes Risborough Bypass ===
The idea of a bypass around Princes Risborough is not an unpopular one, as many residents of the town agree that it would relieve the over-strained town centre. At present, travel north to south in Buckinghamshire is difficult due to the poor standard roads. The road is also expected to unlock to the expansion for around 2,500 homes.
