= Marlow Bridge =

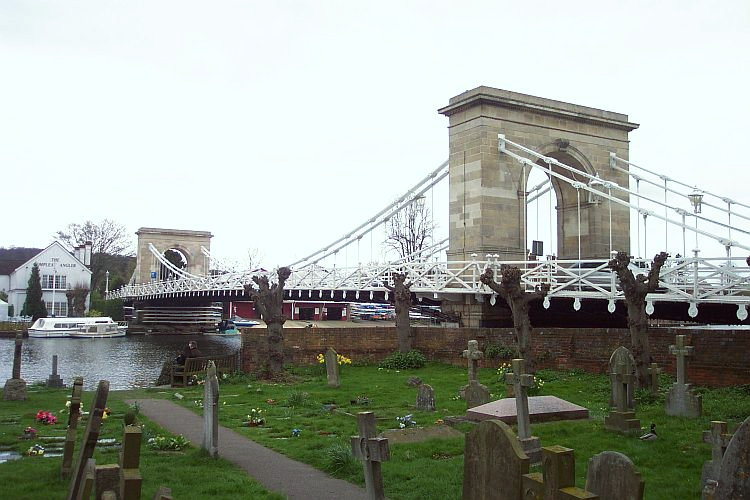
- Marlow Bridge, from All Saints' parish churchyard
- Coordinates: 51.567°N 0.773°W
- Crosses: River Thames
- Locale: Marlow
- Maintained by: Buckinghamshire County Council
- Heritage status

Listed Building – Grade I
- Official name: Marlow Bridge
- Designated: 16 July 1949
- Reference no.: 1332381

Characteristics
- Design: Suspension
- Height: 12 feet 8 inches (3.86 m)
- Longest span: 235 feet (72 m)

History
- Designer: William Tierney Clark
- Opened: 1832

Location
- Interactive map of Marlow Bridge

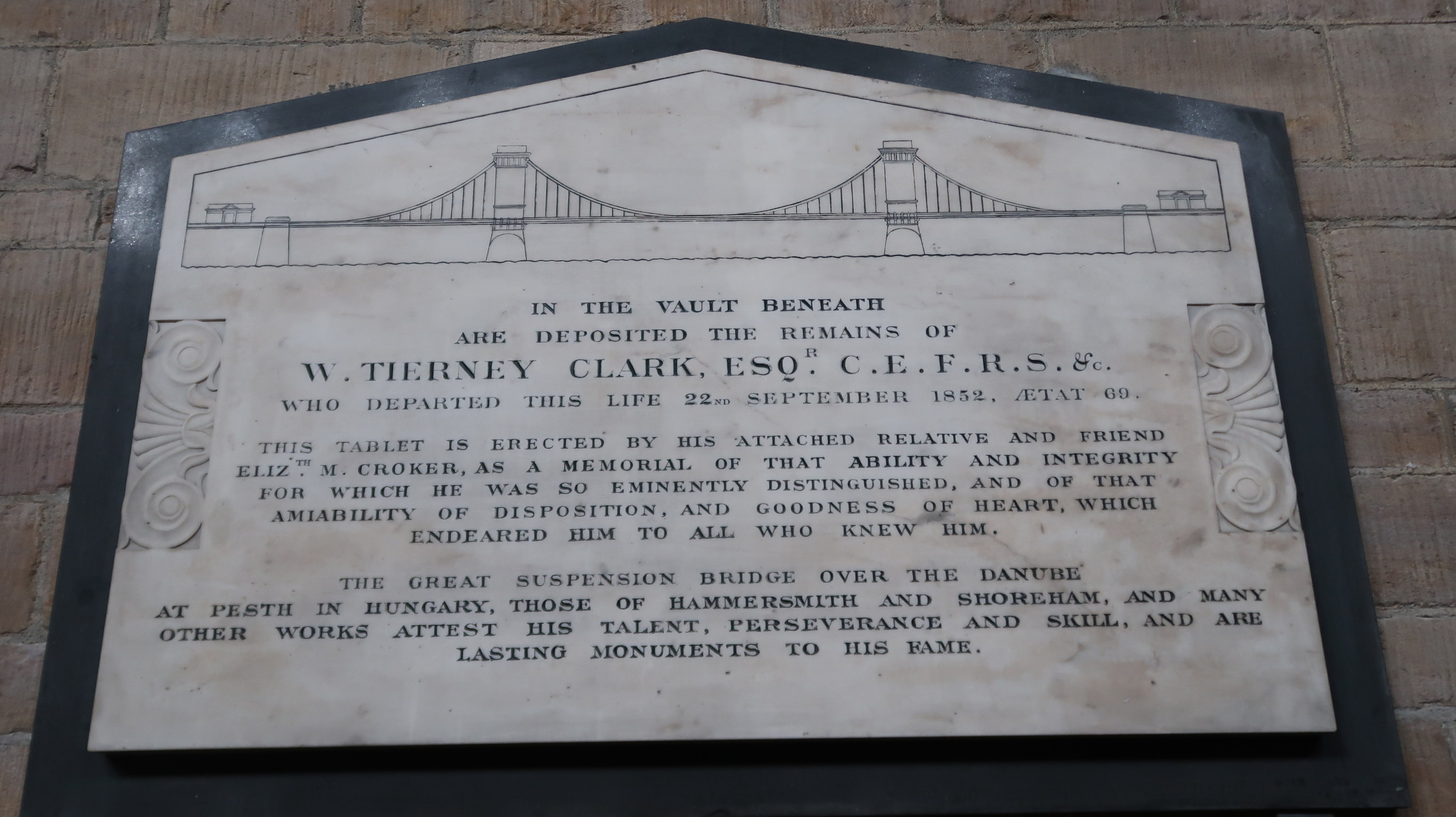
Wall monument to William Tierney Clark in St Paul's Church, Hammersmith, London

Marlow Bridge is a road traffic and foot bridge over the River Thames in England between the town of Marlow, Buckinghamshire and the village of Bisham in Berkshire. It crosses the Thames just upstream of Marlow Lock, on the reach to Temple Lock. The bridge is a Grade I listed building.

== History ==
There has been a bridge on the site since the reign of King Edward III which was stated in around 1530 to have been of timber, though an original crossing to the Knights Templar of Bisham may date from 1309. In 1642 this bridge was partly destroyed by a Parliamentarian army. In 1789 a new timber bridge was built by public subscription with a contribution from the Thames Navigation Commission to increase the headroom underneath. The current suspension bridge was designed by William Tierney Clark and was built between 1829 and 1832, replacing a wooden bridge further downstream which collapsed in 1828. The Széchenyi Chain Bridge, spanning the River Danube in Budapest, was also designed by William Tierney Clark and it is a larger scale version of Marlow bridge.

One of the suspension towers at golden hour (2026)

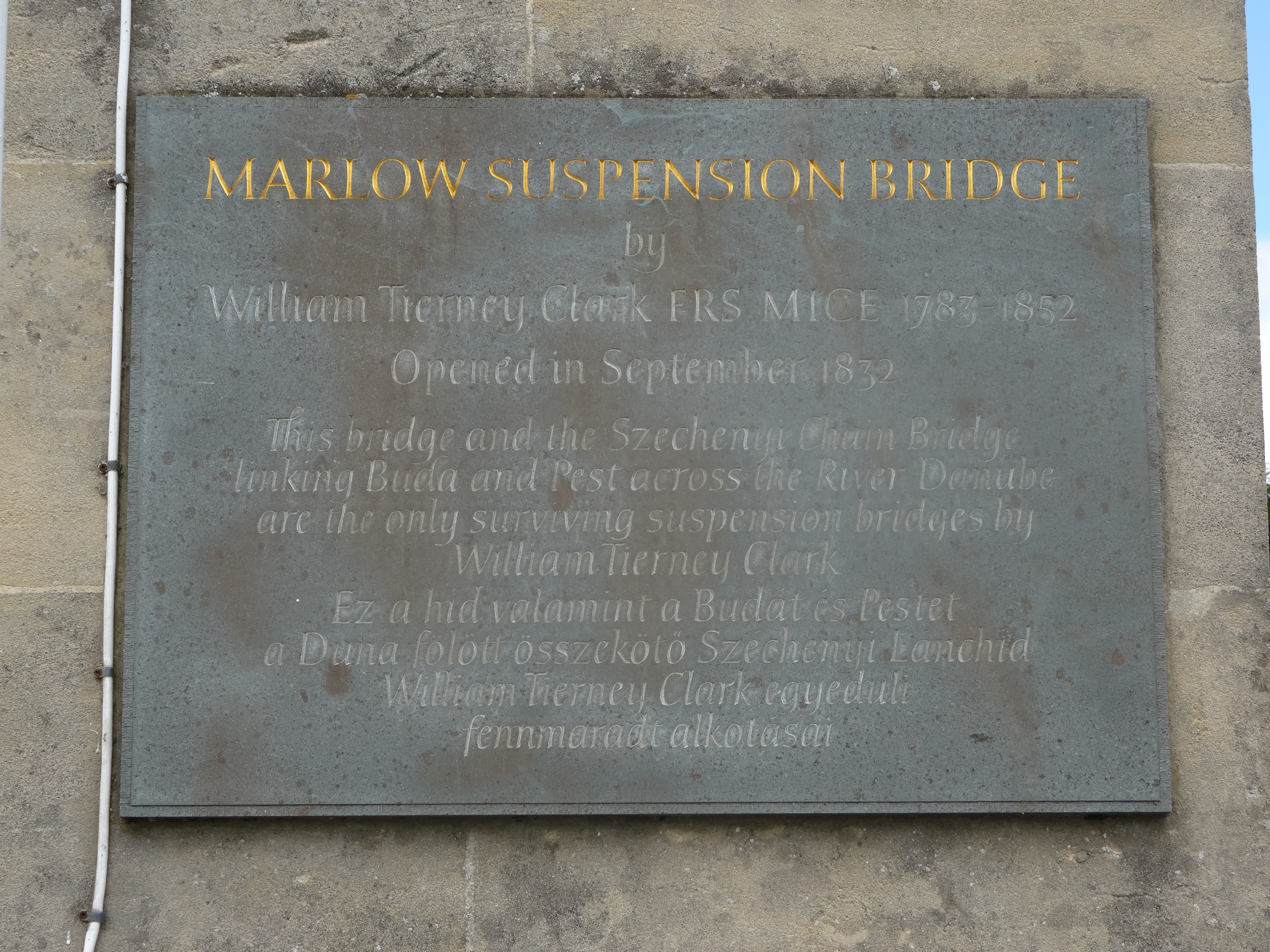
Commemorative plaque on the Marlow Bridge

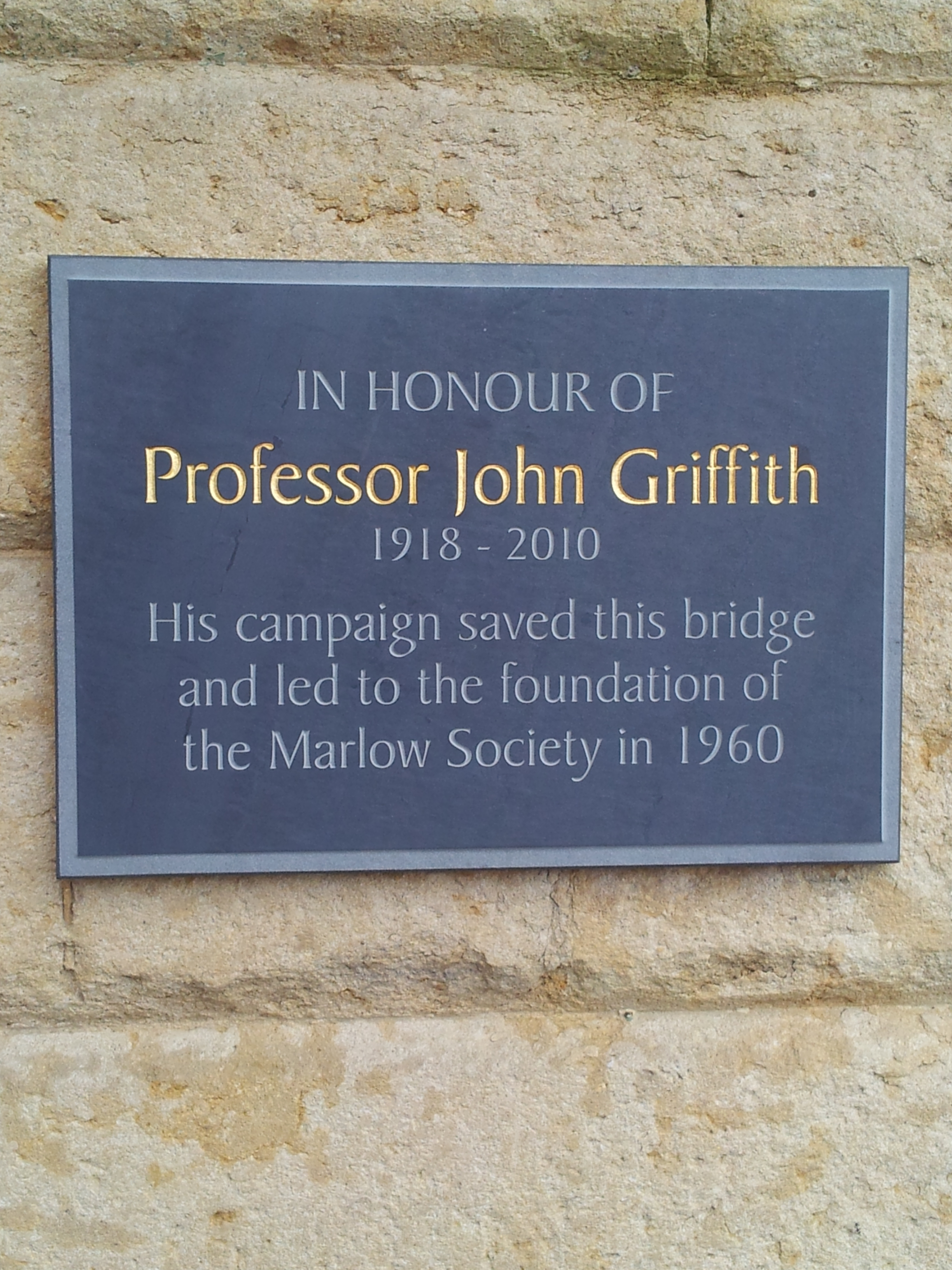
Plaque on the bridge in memory of John Griffith who campaigned to save it in the mid-twentieth century

Between 1957 and 1962, Buckinghamshire county councillor J. A. G. Griffith led a successful campaign to stop proposals by council officers to demolish the impressive but low capacity bridge, which was a bottleneck on the A404 road between High Wycombe and Maidenhead, to be replaced by a modern concrete multi-carriageway bridge. The eventual outcome was the construction of an urban bypass to divert through traffic away from Marlow's High Street, as well as from the historic bridge.

In 1965, the bridge was restored. It has a 3-tonne weight restriction and is used only by foot and local road traffic. Other traffic is carried by the Marlow By-pass Bridge. On 24 September 2016, a 37-tonne Lithuanian haulage lorry attempted to pass over the bridge, requiring it to be closed for two months to allow Buckinghamshire County Council to undertake a series of stress tests on the suspension bridge hangers and pins, together with ultrasound and magnetic particle tests. No significant damage to the bridge was found, and it was reopened on 25 November following restoration of sections exposed for weld testing with three coats of paint, removal of scaffolding surrounding the bridge's two towers, and reinstatement of timber work removed for inspection.

== See also ==
- Crossings of the River Thames
- Széchenyi Chain Bridge

Next bridge upstream	River Thames	Next bridge downstream
Temple Footbridge (pedestrian)	Marlow Bridge; Grid reference SU851860	Marlow By-pass Bridge (road)
