= Marlow By-pass Bridge =

Bridge in Marlow, Buckinghamshire, England

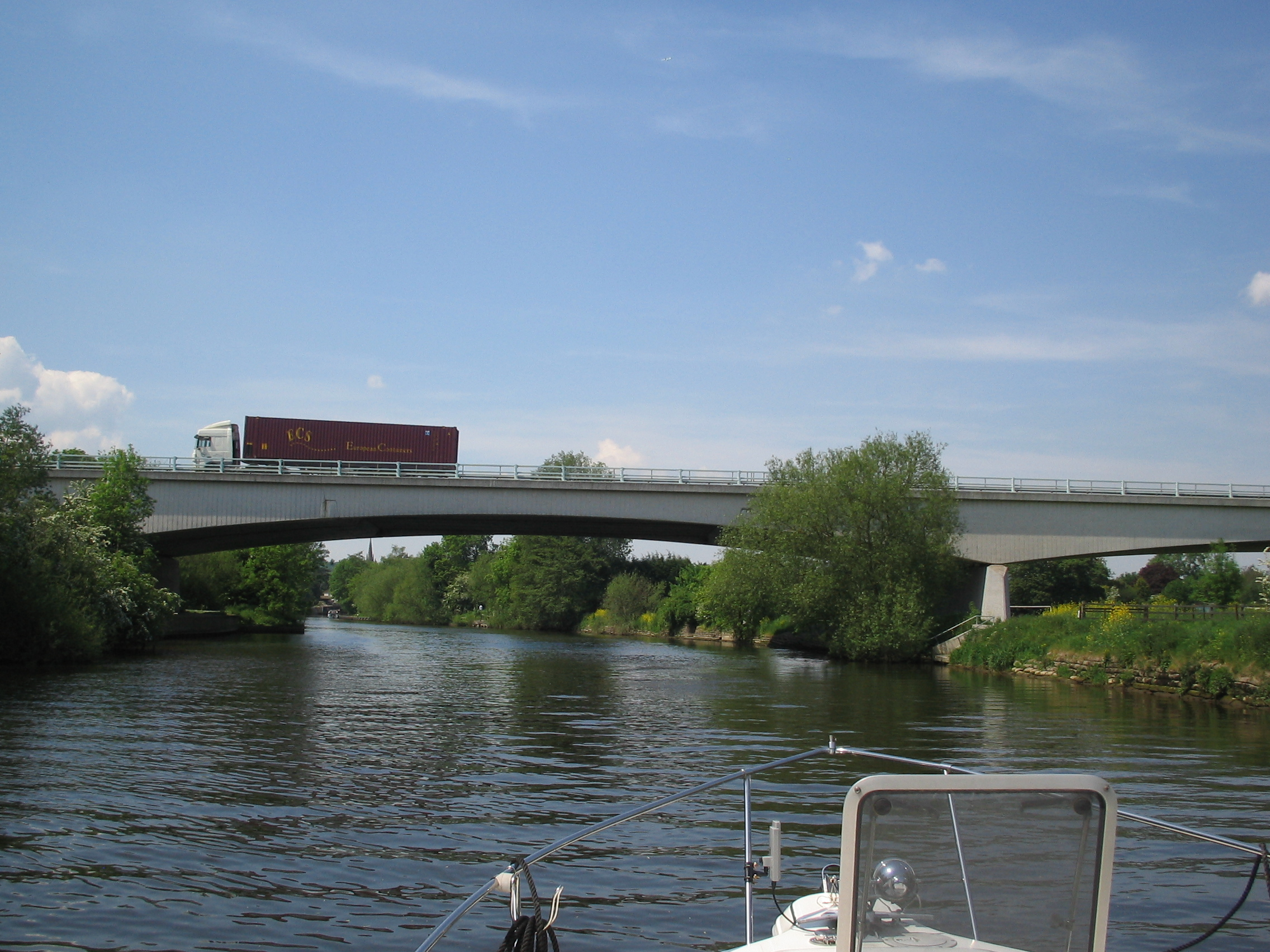
- Marlow By-pass Bridge
- Coordinates: 51°33′58″N 0°45′43″W
- Carries: A404 road
- Crosses: River Thames
- Locale: Marlow

Characteristics
- Design: Balanced cantilever
- Material: Concrete
- Total length: 560 feet (170 m)
- Width: 75 feet (23 m)
- Height: 19 feet 9 inches (6.02 m)
- Longest span: 85 feet (26 m)
- No. of spans: 3

History
- Opened: 1972

Marlow By-pass Bridge is a road bridge across the River Thames in England. It carries the A404 road between Maidenhead, Berkshire and High Wycombe, Buckinghamshire. and crosses the Thames on the reach between Cookham Lock and Marlow Lock.

The bridge forms part of the Marlow by-pass to the east of the town. It was built in 1972.

The area underneath the bridge is used for boat storage by the adjacent outdoor adventure centre at Longridge (a registered charity).

== See also ==
- Crossings of the River Thames

| Next crossing upstream | River Thames | Next crossing downstream |
| Marlow Bridge (road) | Marlow By-pass Bridge | Bourne End Railway Bridge (railway and pedestrian) |
