= Handy Cross roundabout =

Road junction in Buckinghamshire, England

Coordinates: 51.6123°N 0.7685°W

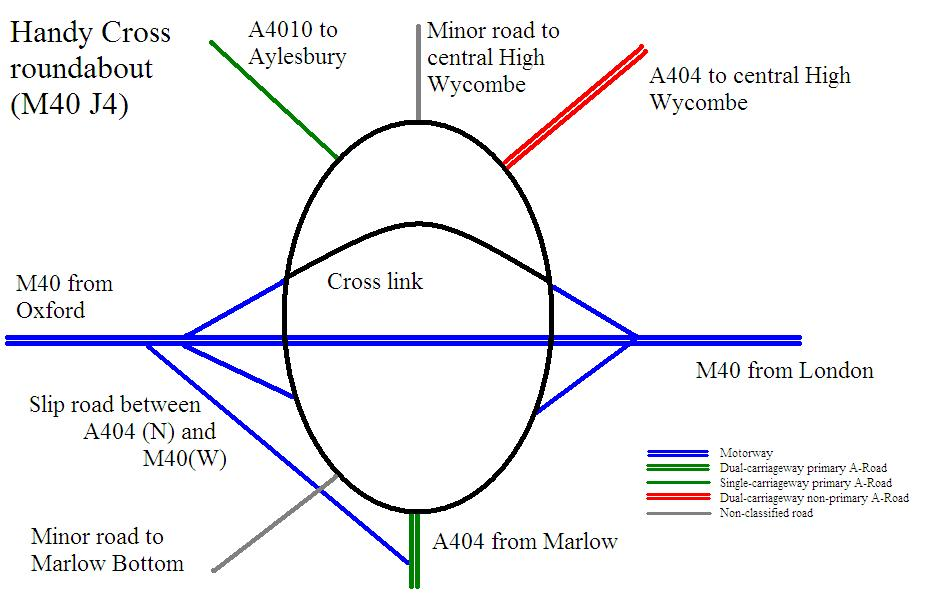
The layout of the roundabout

Handy Cross roundabout is a major road interchange at Handy Cross, High Wycombe, Buckinghamshire; the junction for High Wycombe, the M40 motorway and the A404 dual-carriageway. It is the terminus of the A4010 which runs to Aylesbury.

== History ==
The junction under construction in 1966

The first section of the M40 to open was the section between junctions 4 and 5 in 1967, construction starting in 1964. The 1967 finished roundabout allowed interchange between the M40, the A404 to Marlow, the A404 into central High Wycombe and a minor residential street. The first alteration came in 1972 with the construction of the Marlow bypass (as the A404- the old A404 was downgraded to un-classified). Further urbanisation to the west of the roundabout led to another exit for the roundabout to Cressex and on through Wycombe to the A40-the new road was given the A4010 road number. In 2006, the Highways Agency constructed several improvements to the roundabout including a cut-through, bypassing the three northern exits and a new slip road from the A404 to the M40 westbound.

== Roads served ==
The M40 meets the roundabout numbered as junction 4, temporarily dropping to dual two lane through the junction. The A404 road is dual-carriageway on both sides of the junction, although only the section south into Berkshire has primary status. The northern part goes on into High Wycombe town centre as a non-primary A-road. The only other classified road to meet the roundabout is the A4010 which leads on through the suburb of Cressex and on to Aylesbury. The other two roads are unclassified, one being the original road to Marlow and the other for access to residential areas of High Wycombe.

== Layout ==
The junction is a roundabout interchange with the M40 uninterrupted. The motorway is on a north-west to south-east gradient between Stokenchurch and Loudwater. The roundabout is oval shaped, with the motorway off-centre. The northern half of the roundabout is bisected by a cross link which bypasses the A4010, the minor road to Wycombe and the A404 north, allowing easier interchange from the M40 London-bound to the A404 south. To the south-west of the roundabout, a slip-road allows traffic on the A404 northbound to reach the M40 towards Oxford uninterrupted, it passes beneath the road to Marlow Bottom in-between.
