= J. A. G. Griffith =

Welsh legal scholar

J. A. G. Griffith FBA
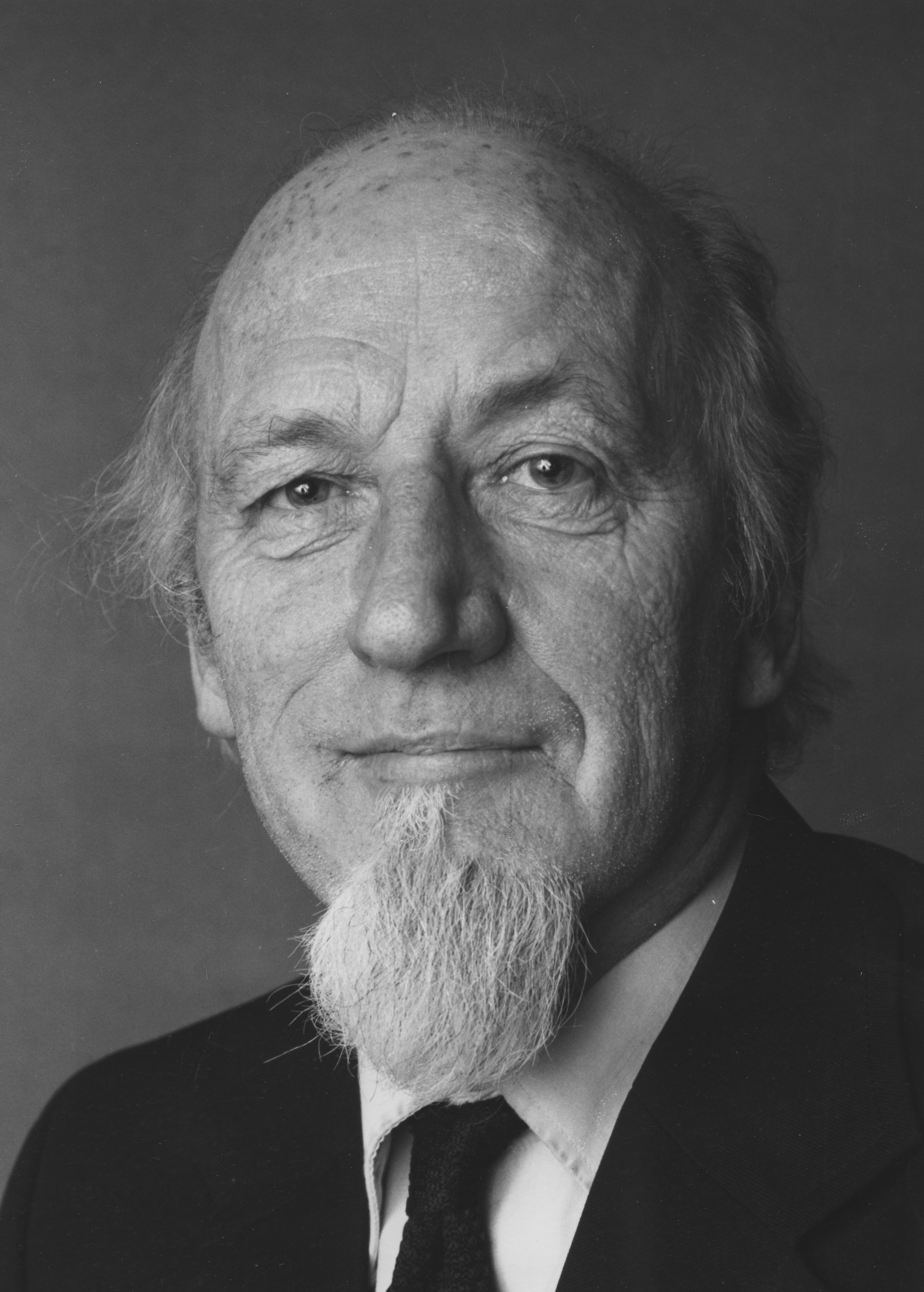
- Born: John Aneurin Grey Griffith; 14 October 1918; Cardiff, Wales
- Died: 8 May 2010 (aged 91)
- Spouse: Barbara Garnet (m. 1941)

Academic background
- Education: London School of Economics (LLB, LLM)
- Influences: Harold Laski, Ivor Jennings, William A. Robson

Academic work
- Discipline: Law
- Institutions: University College of Wales; London School of Economics (1948–1984)

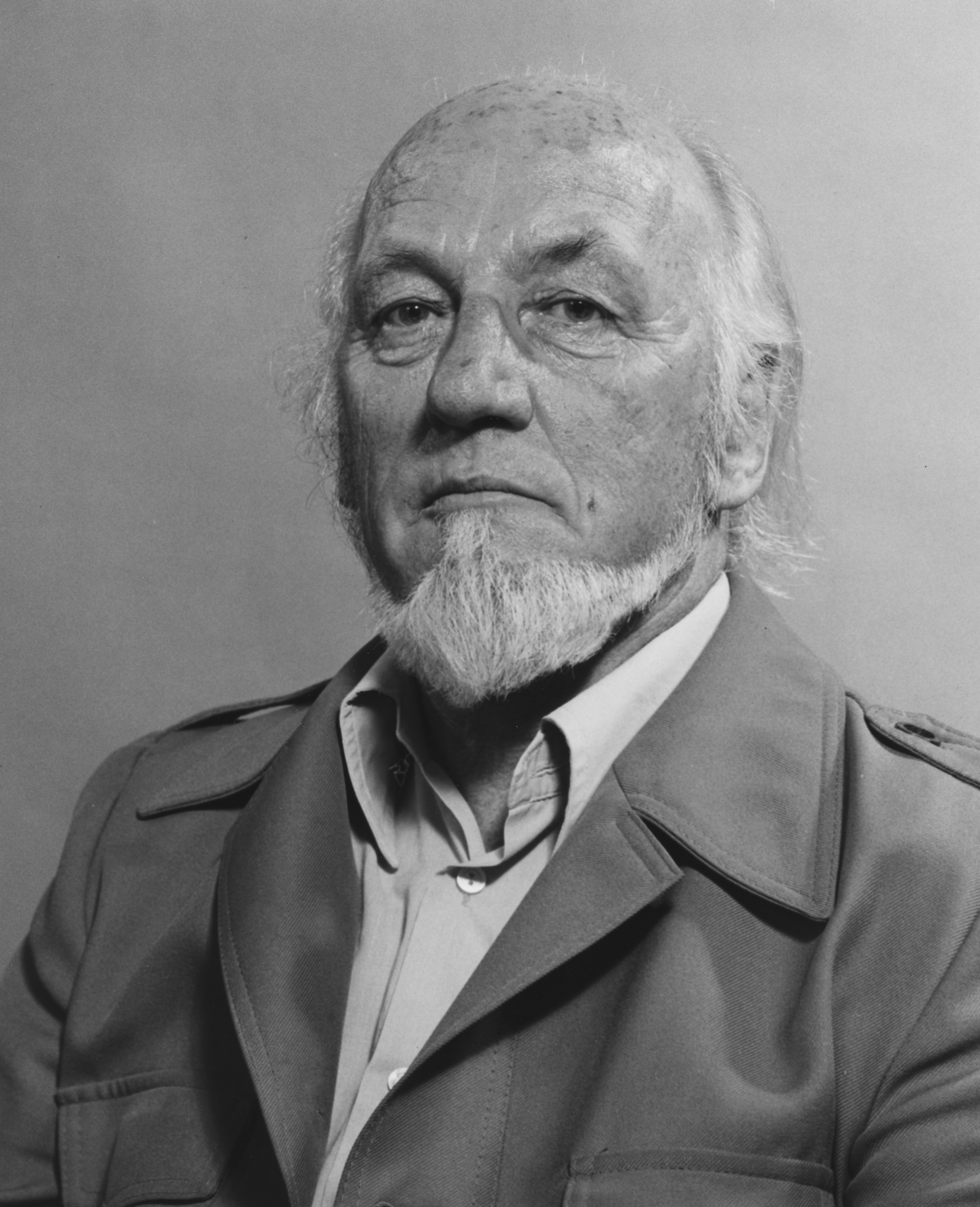
John Aneurin Grey Griffith, c. 1970s

John Aneurin Grey Griffith, FBA (14 October 1918 – 8 May 2010) was a Welsh legal scholar who spent much of his academic career within the Faculty of Law of the London School of Economics and Political Science. The Guardian described Griffith as "one of the leading public law scholars of the 20th century."

== Early life and education ==
He was born in Cardiff to a Baptist family, Rev. B. Grey Griffith and Bertha. He was educated at Taunton School in Somerset, where he became a pacifist. He graduated with a first-class LLB at the London School of Economics in 1940. He was called to the bar. He was a member of the Peace Pledge Union and initially registered as a conscientious objector during the Second World War, serving two years in the Royal Army Medical Corps. He unregistered as conscientious objector and began officer training in the Indian Army, serving a further two years and left in 1946 as a major.

== Legal career ==
After the War he lectured at the University College of Wales from 1946 to 1948 and concurrently completed an LLM at the LSE. He returned to the LSE in 1948 as a lecturer in law, becoming a Reader in English law in 1954. Griffith subsequently became Professor of English Law 1959 to 1970; then he was Professor of Public law from 1970 until he retired in 1984, becoming Emeritus Professor of Public Law. He held a Visiting Professorship at University of California, Berkeley in 1966 and at York University, Toronto in 1985. Post-retirement, he was elected as Chancellor of the University of Manchester, a post he held for seven years. He was elected a Fellow of the British Academy in 1977.

Griffith's legal works, according to Martin Loughlin, "subverted the self-satisfied liberal-democratic view about the nature and functioning of the constitution, replacing it with a more realistic “what actually happens” account...his more explicitly political analyses tended to highlight the authoritarian nature of government and in particular the close political, social and class linkages of the elites in power". Griffith also "advanced a radical critique of the role of the judiciary, especially when it strayed into the field of politics". Griffith believed that the idea of "the rule of law" was "a fantasy invented by Liberals of the old school in the late-19th century and patented by the Tories to throw a protective sanctity around certain legal and political institutions and principles which they wish to preserve at any cost".

In its review of Griffith's 1977 work The Politics of the Judiciary, the Times Literary Supplement claimed that Griffith "ends up aligned with the Baader–Meinhof gang in believing that every criminal trial is categorically unjust". The book subsequently became a bestseller and Lord Denning later complained: "The youngsters believe that we come from a narrow background—it's nonsense—they get it from that man Griffith".

== Local government career ==
Griffith was the first-elected Labour member of Marlow Urban District council in 1950. He was re-elected at the head of the poll in 1953, but stood down in 1955 when he was elected as a Labour member of Buckinghamshire County Council for Marlow, serving until 1961.

As a county councillor, he led a successful campaign to stop the proposed demolition of the low capacity nineteenth-century Grade I listed Marlow Bridge, to be replaced by a modern concrete multi-carriageway bridge. The eventual outcome was the construction of an urban bypass which diverted through traffic away from the town's High Street as well as the historic bridge.

== Personal life ==
He married Barbara Eirene Garnet, with whom he had two sons and one daughter. In his Who's Who entry, he listed his recreations as "Drinking beer, writing bad verse".

== Works ==
- (with Harry Street), Principles of Administrative Law (1952).
- (with Harry Street), A Casebook of Administrative Law (1964).
- Central Departments and Local Authorities (1966).
- Parliamentary Scrutiny of Government Bills (1974).
- (with Trevor Hartley), Government and Law (1975).
- The Politics of the Judiciary (1977).
- (with Harriet Harman), Justice Deserted (1979).
- Socialism in a Cold Climate (1983).
- (with Michael Ryle), Parliament: Functions, Practice and Procedures (1989).
- Judicial Politics since 1920: A Chronicle (1993).
