= A308(M) motorway =

Road in England

A308(M)
- A308(M) highlighted in blue

Route information
- Maintained by National Highways
- Length: 0.6 mi (970 m)
- Existed: 1971–present

Major junctions
- East end: M4 Junction 8/9
- M4 motorway A404(M) motorway
- West end: Maidenhead (Braywick)

Location
- Country: United Kingdom
- Primary destinations: Maidenhead, Windsor, Bracknell

Road network
- Roads in the United Kingdom; Motorways; A and B road zones

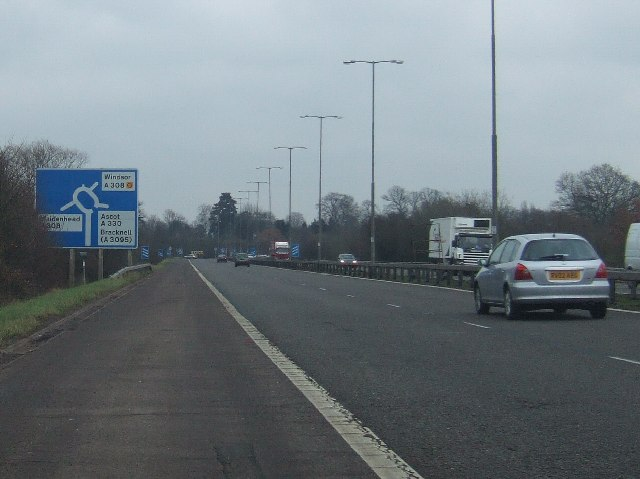
Looking towards the A308(M) terminus with the A308 and A330.

The A308(M) is a motorway in Berkshire, England. It is 0.6 miles (0.97 km) long. It forms part of the Maidenhead bypass and runs from the M4 at junction 8/9 to the A308 south of Maidenhead town centre. The A308(M) is generally considered to be Britain's second shortest motorway, after the A635(M) on the Mancunian Way.

== History ==
In 1961 the A4(M) was opened and ran from the existing junction 7, through a junction with the A308 and ending at a junction with the A4. In 1963, the Slough bypass was opened to junction 7 and the A4(M) was renumbered M4, junction 8 being with the A308 and junction 9 with the A4.

The proposed route of the M4 was then changed to go south of Reading, instead of north of it. When the M4 was extended in 1971, a new junction was provided to connect with what would become a spur. This new interchange was built too close to the original junction 8, so this had to be closed. A new junction (numbered 8/9 so as not to confuse motorists) was built. The original M4 north of this was renumbered as the A423(M) and in the 1990s this was again reclassified as the A404(M). A new spur, the A308(M), was built to maintain access to the A308 and connected with the A404(M) and the M4 at the same grade separated roundabout.

== Junctions ==
Note: motorway has no junction numbers

A308(M) motorway junctions
Eastbound exits	Junction	Westbound exits
Road continues as A308 to Maidenhead, Windsor; A330 to Ascot and Bracknell (A3095)	A308 & A330; Terminus	London, Reading (M4) A308(M), Oxford A404(M)
Maidenhead, Windsor A308, Ascot A330, Bracknell A3095	A308 & A330; Terminus	Start of motorway
Start of motorway Maidenhead (Central) A308(M)	M4 J8/9; A404(M)	The West M4(W), London M4(E); High Wycombe A404(M)

== See also ==
- List of motorways in the United Kingdom
- A404(M) motorway
