= Széchenyi Chain Bridge =

Oldest bridge in Budapest

Chain Bridge
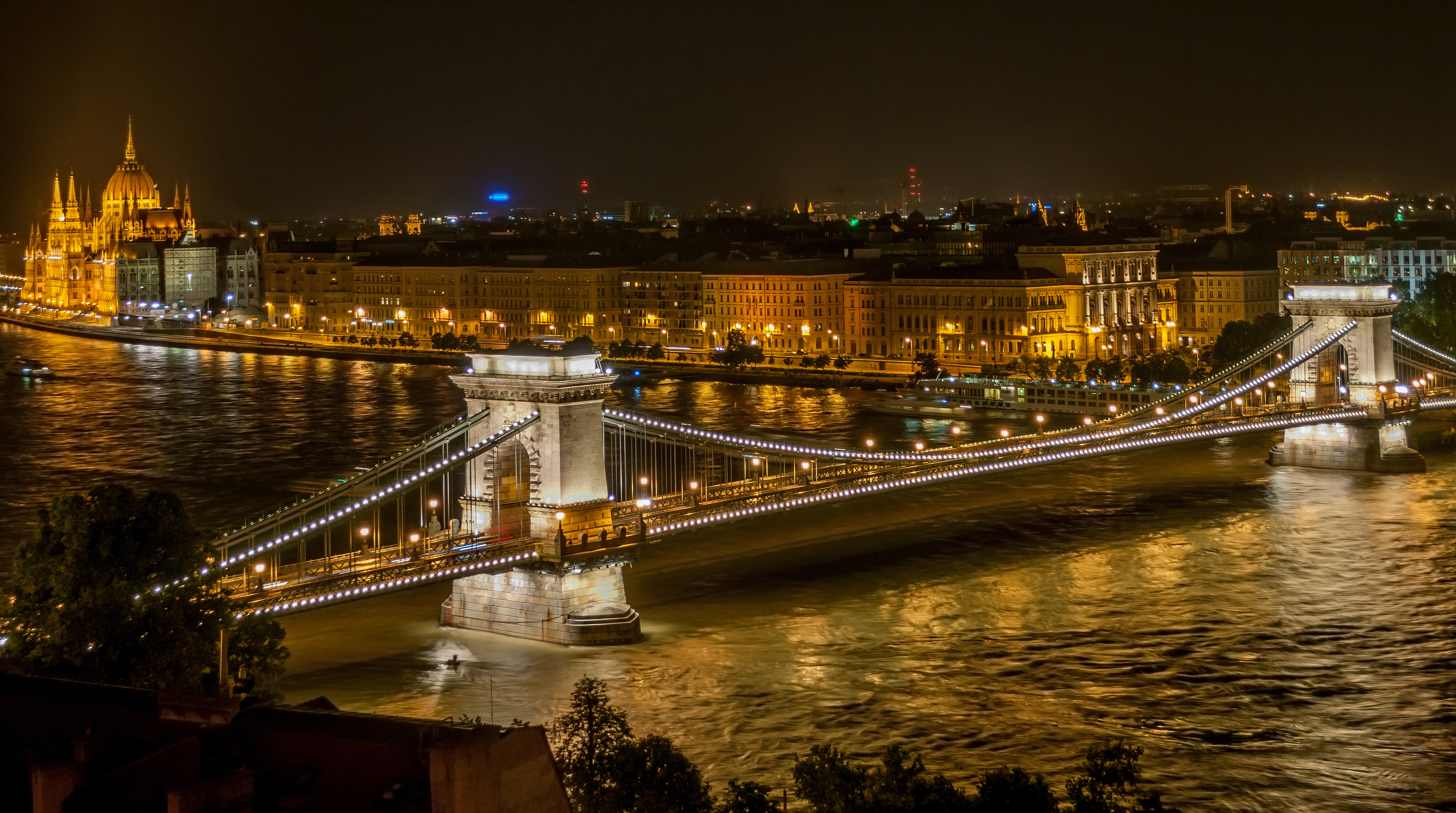
- Chain Bridge and the Hungarian Parliament Building
- Coordinates: 47°29′56″N 19°02′37″E
- Carries: 2 road lanes
- Crosses: Danube River
- Locale: Budapest
- Official name: Széchenyi Lánchíd
- Other name: Lánchíd

Characteristics
- Design: chain suspension bridge
- Material: Wrought iron and stone
- Total length: 375 metres (1,230 ft)
- Width: 14.8 metres (49 ft)
- Longest span: 202 metres (663 ft)

History
- Designer: William Tierney Clark
- Construction start: 1840
- Construction end: 1849
- Opened: November 20, 1849

Location
- Interactive map of Chain Bridge

The Széchenyi Chain Bridge (Hungarian: Széchenyi lánchíd [ˈseːt͡ʃeːɲi ˈlaːnt͡shiːd]) is a chain bridge that spans the River Danube between Buda and Pest, the western and eastern sides of Budapest, the capital of Hungary. Designed by English engineer William Tierney Clark and built by Scottish engineer Adam Clark, it was the first permanent bridge across the Danube in Hungary. It was opened in 1849. It is anchored on the Pest side of the river to Széchenyi Square (formerly Roosevelt Square), adjacent to the Gresham Palace and the Hungarian Academy of Sciences, and on the Buda side to Adam Clark Square, near the Zero Kilometre Stone and the lower end of the Castle Hill Funicular, leading to Buda Castle.

The bridge bears the name of István Széchenyi, a major supporter of its construction, but is most commonly known as the "Chain Bridge". At the time of its construction, it was regarded as a marvel of modern engineering. Its decorations are made of cast iron.

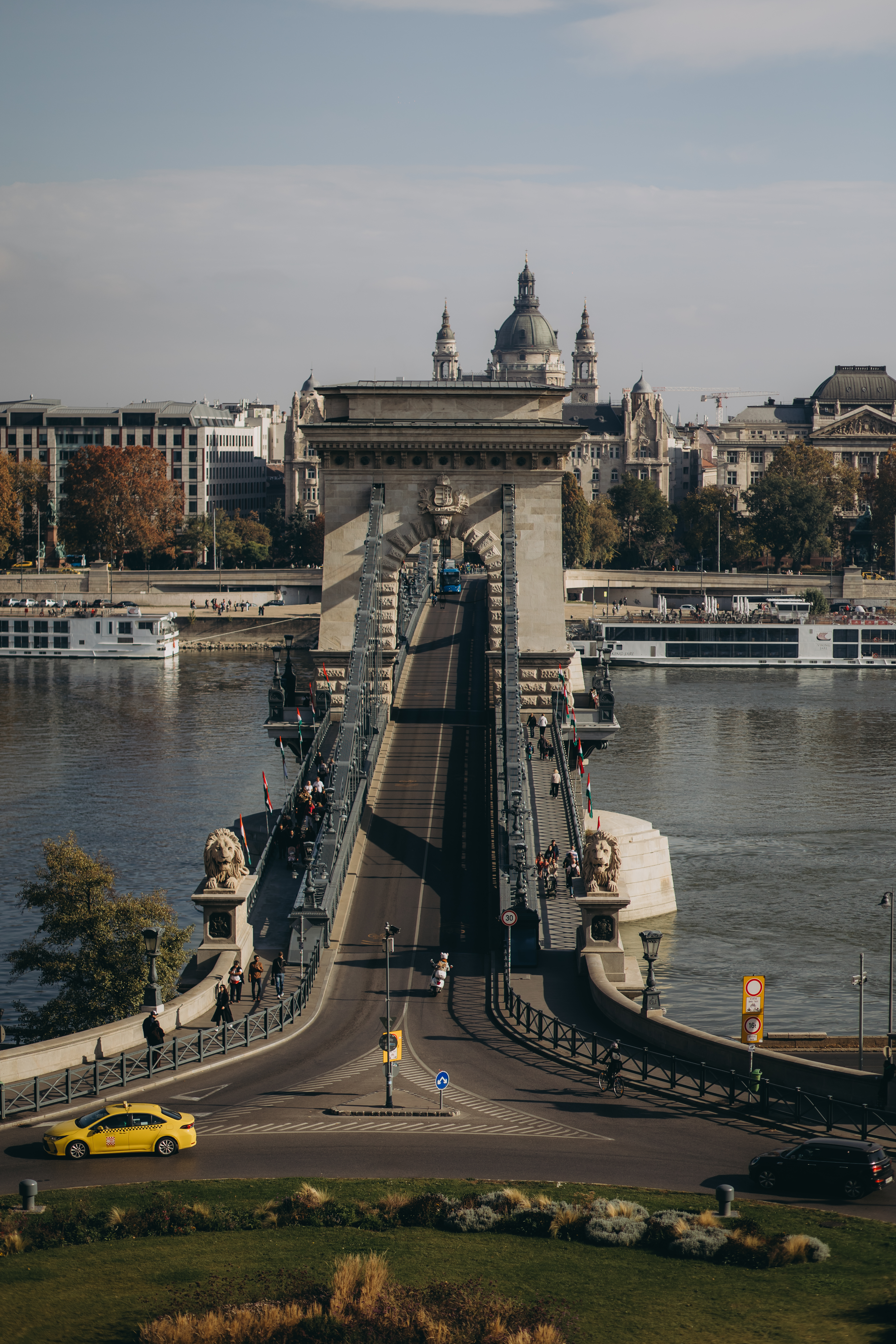
Széchenyi Chain Bridge

== History ==
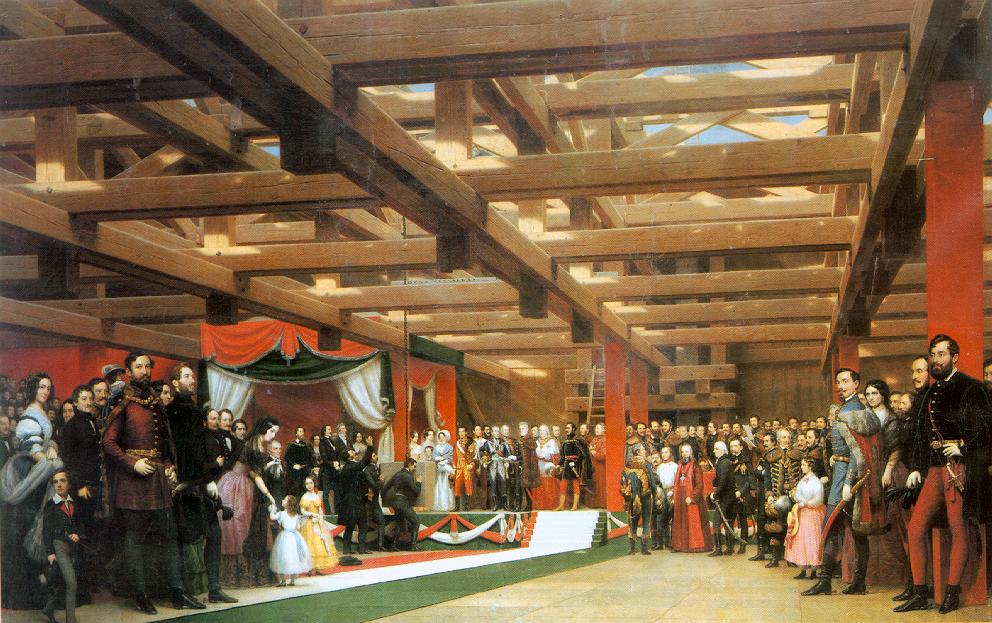
Laying the foundation-stone for the bridge (painting by Miklós Barabás, 1864)

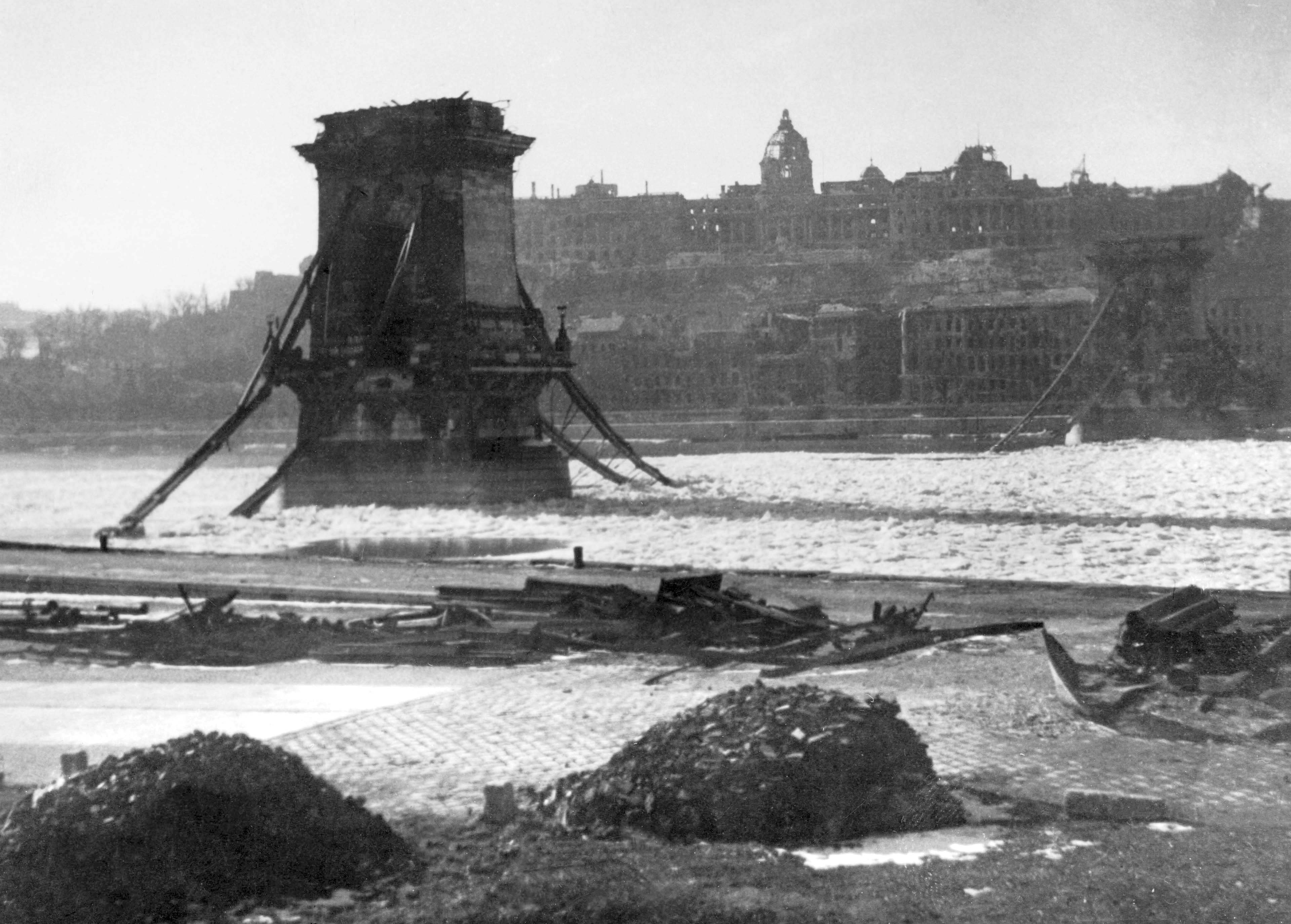
The Széchenyi Chain Bridge and Buda Castle in ruins after World War II (1946)

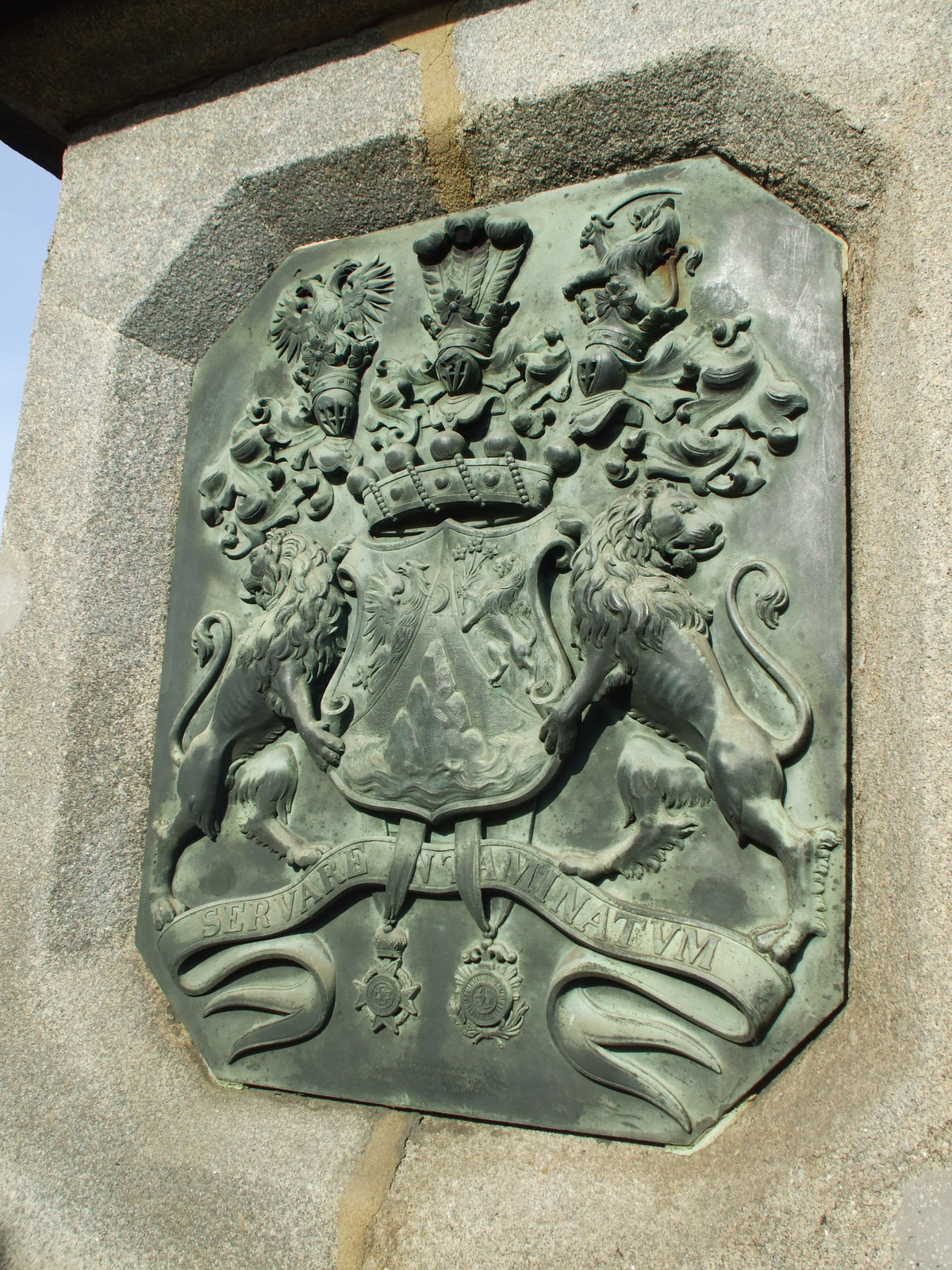
Coat of Arms of the Sina family

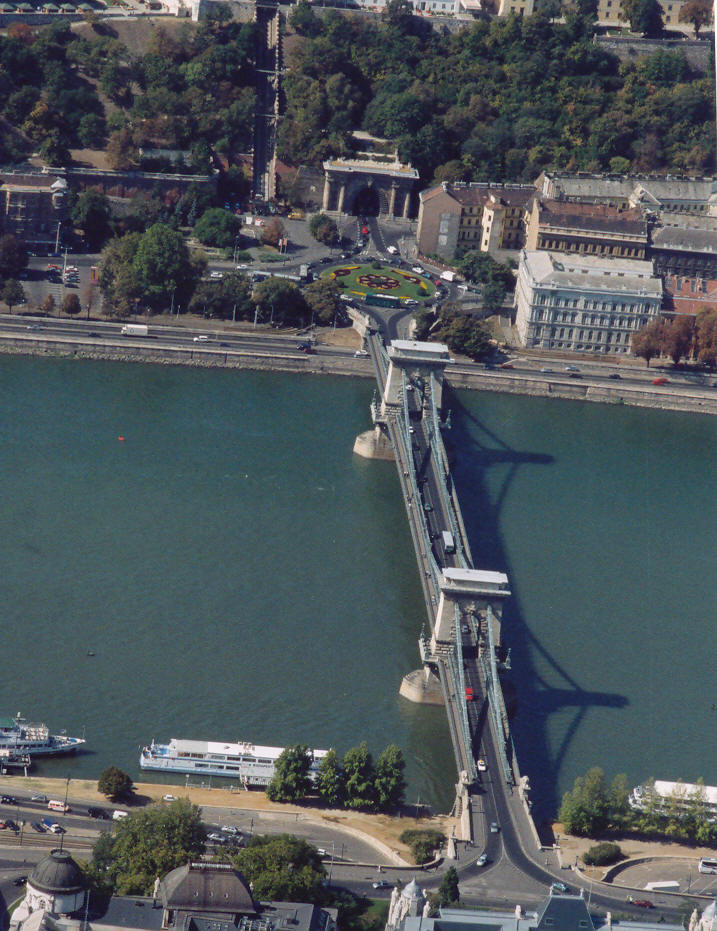
Aerial view of the Chain Bridge

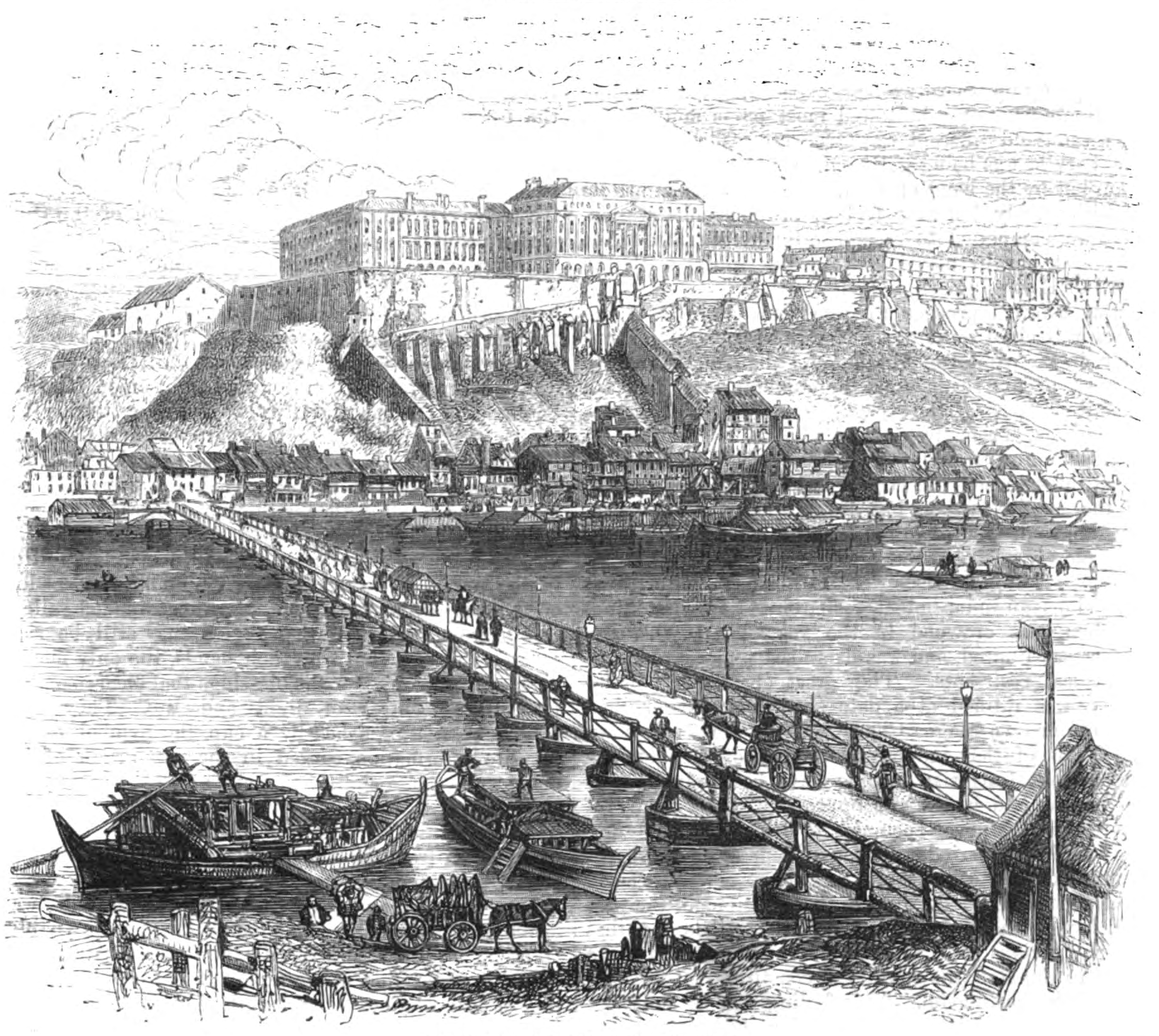
Old bridge between Buda and Pest

The bridge was designed by English engineer William Tierney Clark in 1839, following an initiative by Count István Széchenyi, with construction supervised locally by Scottish engineer Adam Clark (no relation). It is a larger-scale version of Tierney Clark's earlier Marlow Bridge, across the River Thames in Marlow, England, and was designed in sections and shipped from the United Kingdom to Hungary for final construction. In 2025, the Hungarian Museum of Science, Technology and Transport announced that they had identified a set of 185-year-old, previously unknown construction drawings by Adam Clark for the Chain Bridge.

It was funded to a considerable extent by the Greek merchant Georgios Sinas who had financial and land interests in the city and whose name is inscribed on the base of the south-western foundation of the bridge on the Buda side.

The bridge opened in 1849, after the Hungarian Revolution of 1848, becoming the first permanent bridge in the Hungarian capital. At the time, its centre span of 202 metres (663 ft) was one of the largest in the world. The lions at each of the abutments were carved in stone by the sculptor János Marschalkó and installed in 1852. The bronze lions of Trafalgar Square (commissioned in 1858 and installed in 1867) are similar in design to the Chain bridge lions. The bridge was given its current name in 1898.

The bridge's cast-iron structure was updated and strengthened in 1914. In October 1918, amidst the Aster Revolution, it was the site of the "Battle of the Chain Bridge", during which the police killed three or four demonstrators and injured dozens. In World War II, the bridge was blown up on 18 January 1945 by the retreating Germans during the Siege of Budapest, with only the towers remaining. It was rebuilt, and reopened in 1949.

The inscription on each side of the bridge is to "Clark Adam", the bridge builder's name in the local Eastern name order. A plaque on the Pest side of the river reads "To commemorate the only two surviving bridges designed by William Tierney Clark: The Széchenyi Chain Bridge over the Danube at Budapest and the suspension bridge over the Thames at Marlow, England."

The bridge was closed for traffic between March 2021 and August 2023 for renovations.

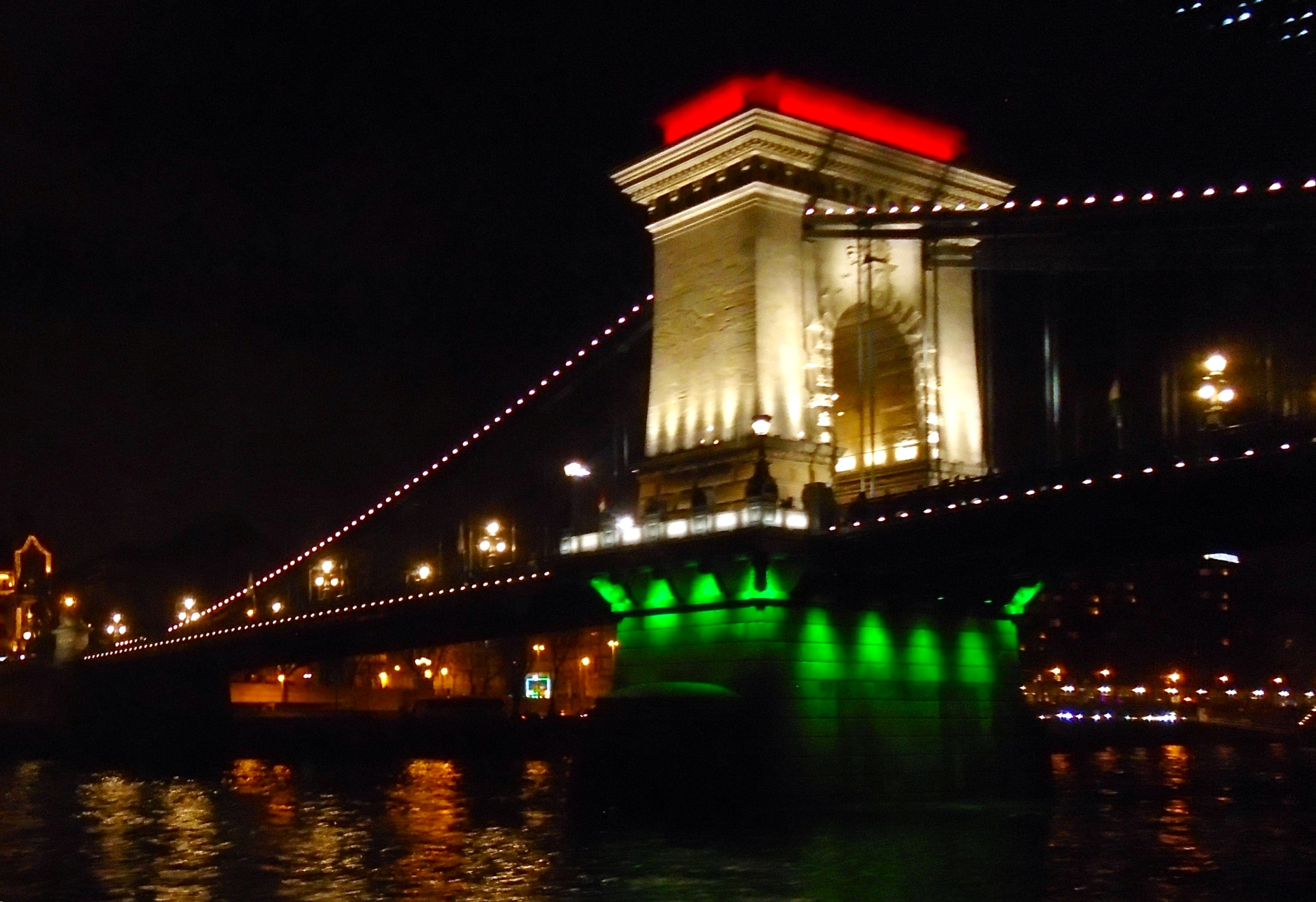
Széchenyi Chain Bridge at night

== In popular culture ==
In 2001 Hungarian stunt pilot Péter Besenyei flew upside down under the bridge, a manoeuvre that has become a standard in Red Bull air races today.

The bridge is featured in the films Music Box, I Spy, Au Pair, Walking with the Enemy and Spy, and is the setting of the climax in the Bollywood blockbuster Hum Dil De Chuke Sanam. The bridge appears in the opening shots of the 2021 Black Widow trailer, and season two of Baptiste.

The bridge featured prominently in Matthew Barney's Cremaster 5, serving as a reference to Harry Houdini, and also appears in Dan Brown's novel Origin and in Syfy channel's 12 Monkeys Season Two premiere episode in April 2016.

It also appears at the beginning of the video for Katy Perry's song "Firework", and K-pop vocal duo Davichi's music video for the song "Cry Again".

According to a Hungarian legend, the lions of Széchenyi Chain Bridge have no tongues. This legend is not true, the tongues are just not visible.

The bridge has been depicted on the Hungarian 200 Forint coin since 2012.

== See also ==
- Marlow Bridge
- Bridges of Budapest
- List of crossings of the Danube
