= Handy Cross =

Hamlet in Buckinghamshire, England, United Kingdom

Coordinates: 51.6086°N 0.7710°W

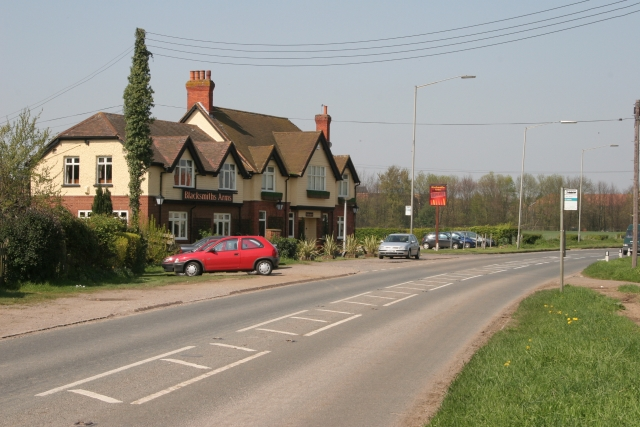
Handy Cross, 2005

Handy Cross is a hamlet in the parish of Little Marlow, Buckinghamshire, England. It is located on Marlow Hill, on the old road between Marlow and High Wycombe. At the 2011 Census the population of the hamlet was included in the civil parish of Great Marlow. Today the hamlet consists of a farm, several households and a Harvester pub & restaurant.

The name Handy Cross is also used to refer to the neighbouring Handy Cross roundabout which is an M40 motorway junction (junction 4) linking the M40 to both Marlow and Wycombe. The junction was upgraded during 2006 and early 2007 to improve traffic flows between the M40 and A404.
