= Harrow Road =

Street in London

Coordinates: 51°33′16″N 0°18′55″W

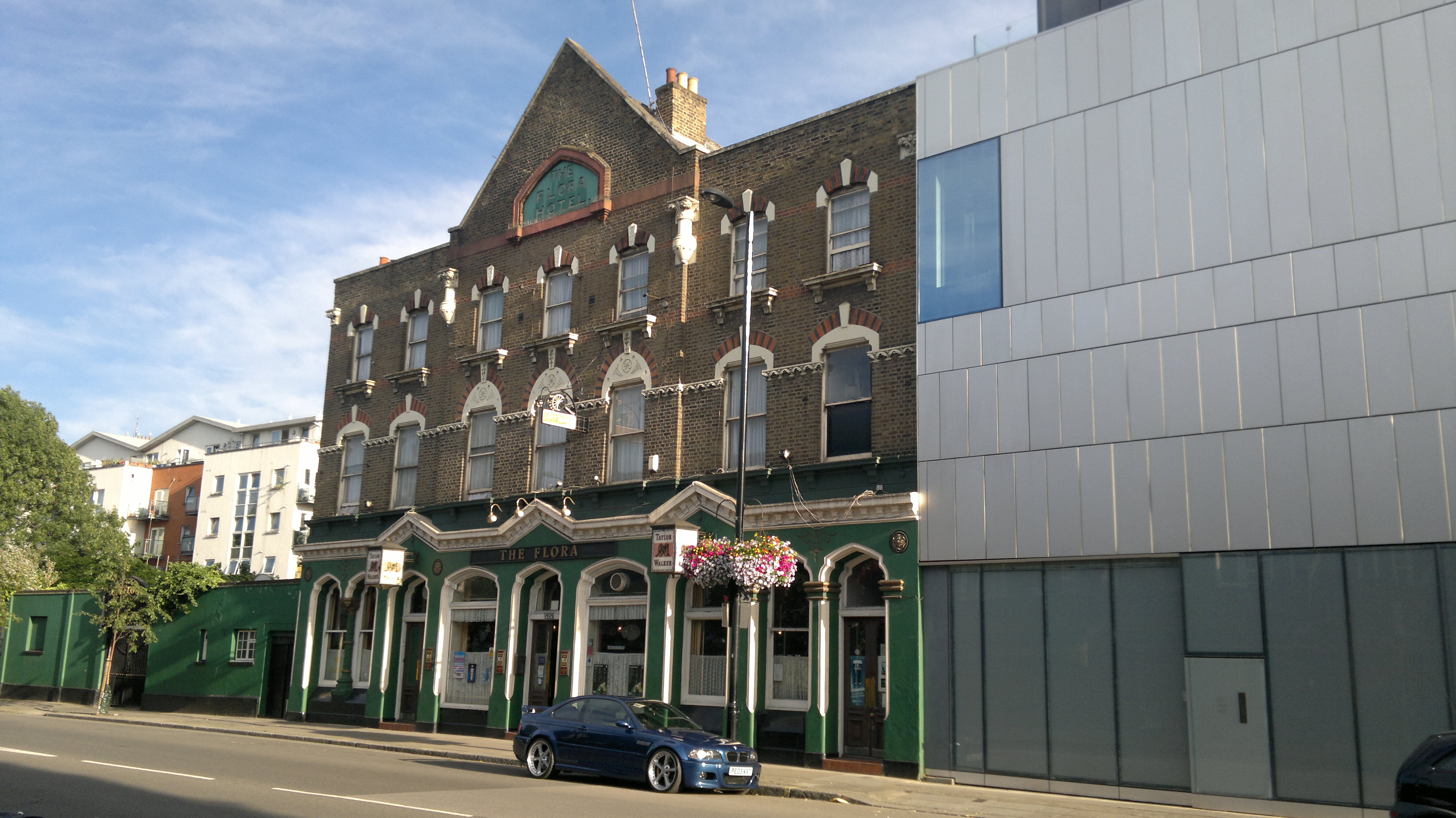
The Flora, 525 Harrow Road

Harrow Road is an ancient route in north west London which runs from Paddington in a northwesterly direction towards Harrow with a length of 9.3 miles (15.0 km). It is also the name given to the immediate surrounding area of Queens Park and Kensal Green, straddling the NW10, W10, W2 and W9 postcodes. With minor deviations in the 19th and 20th centuries, the route remains otherwise unaltered.

Harrow Road is a ward of the City of Westminster. The population of this ward at the 2021 Census was 11,381.

== Route ==
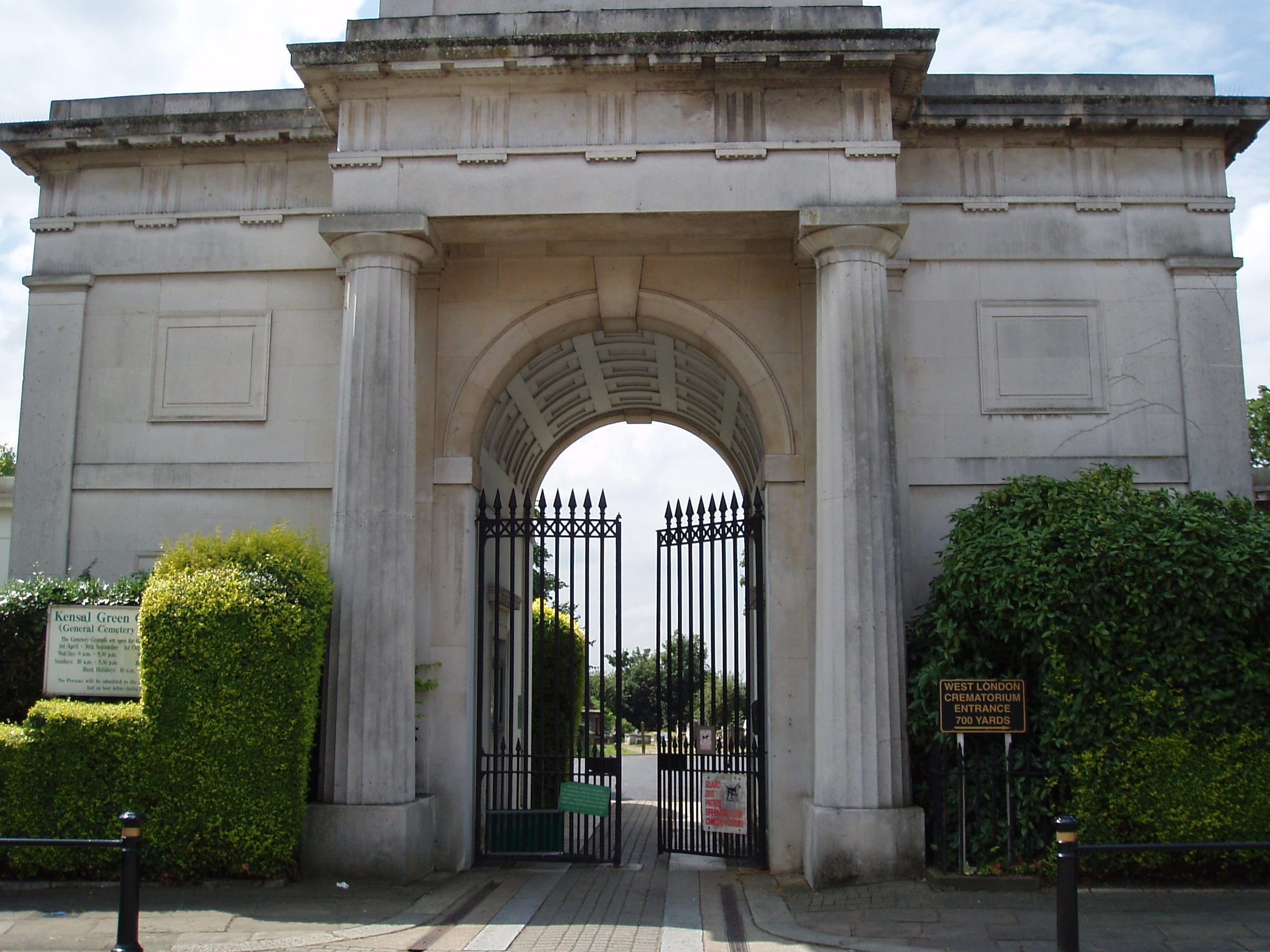
The main entrance of Kensal Green Cemetery, on Harrow Road

Before urbanisation the entire road was known as the "Harrow Road" but, as various local authorities came into existence and imposed independent numbering schemes and more localised descriptions on the parts of the road within their respective boundaries, the principal name was replaced in a number of places along its course. The current street names (with road numbers) running from Paddington to Harrow are as follows:

Starting at the junction of Harrow Road and Edgware Road at Paddington Green in the City of Westminster:

- Harrow Road (Paddington), passing through Maida Hill, Queens Park and Kensal Green. This stretch runs partially alongside and underneath the Westway urban motorway.

At the junction of Ladbroke Grove the road leaves the City of Westminster and forms the boundary between the London Borough of Brent and the Royal Borough of Kensington and Chelsea (except for the length between Kensal Green station and the entrance to Kensal Green Cemetery where it is entirely within Brent) until reaching Scrubs Lane where it becomes entirely within the borough of Brent.

- High Street (Harlesden), also known as the A404 road
- Craven Park, A404
- Hillside, A404
- Brentfield, A404

Passing over the River Brent which formed the pre-1965 boundary between the former Municipal Borough of Willesden and the Metropolitan Borough of Wembley (both now defunct) and from which the modern borough takes its name:

- Harrow Road (Wembley), A404

Which passes through Tokyngton

- High Road (Wembley), A404
- Harrow Road (Sudbury), A404, changing to A4005 at the junction with Watford Road (which continues the A404)

Passing from the London Borough of Brent into the London Borough of Harrow at the Sudbury Court Drive junction:

- Sudbury Hill, A4005
- London Road (Harrow), A4005, changing to B457 at junction with Roxeth Hill
- High Street (Harrow), B457

== History ==
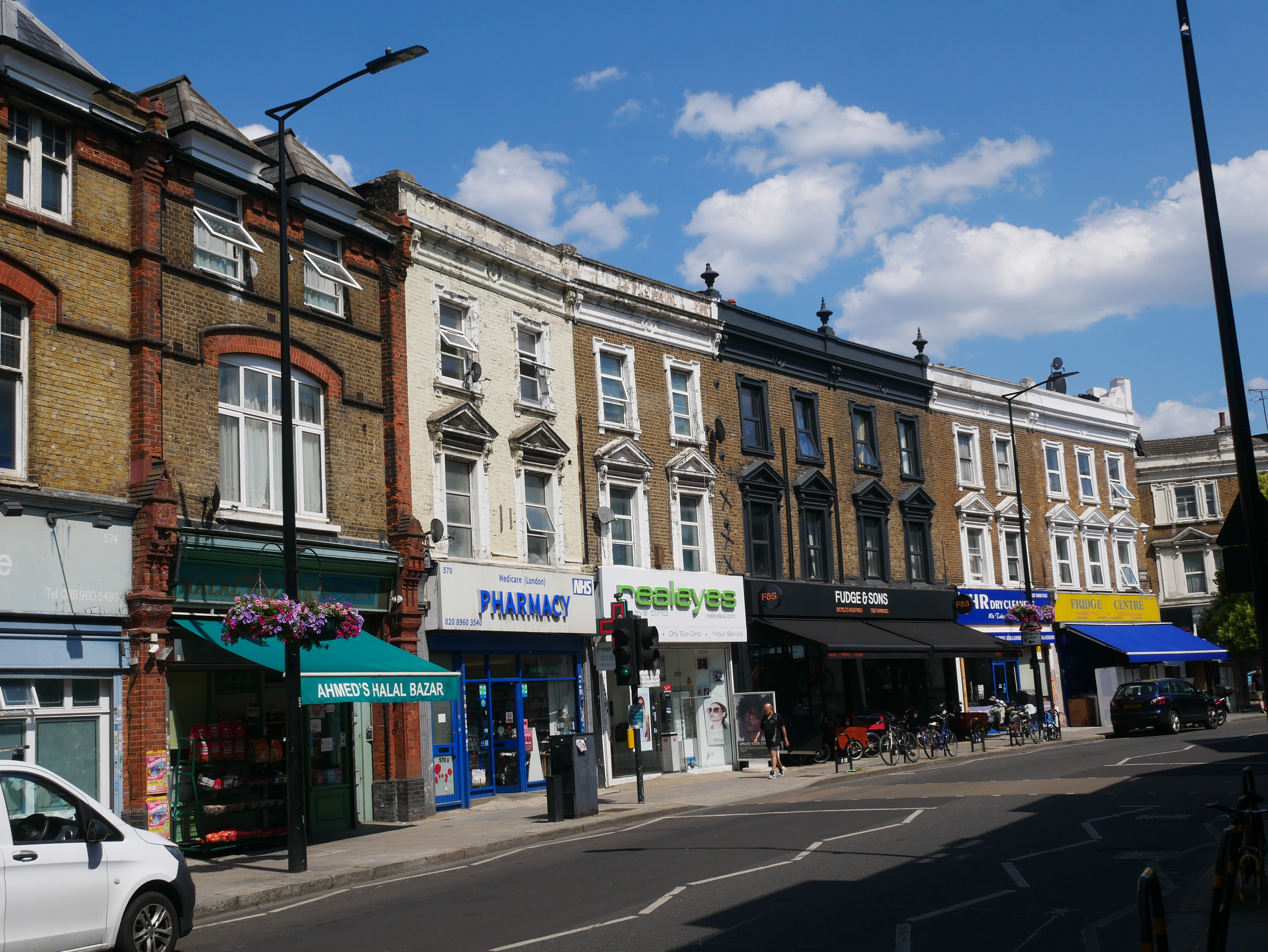
Shops between 572 and 560 Harrow Road, as it passes near West Kilburn.

What is now Harrow Road was a track in Iron Age Britain. By the 19th century, it had become the main street in Paddington.

In the 20th century, many properties along Harrow Road were developed into high-rise social housing, though some 19th-century houses and commercial buildings north of the Paddington Basin were retained. These included Elgin Towers, constructed between 1966 and 1969, and demolished in 1994.

== In popular culture ==
The 1950 film The Blue Lamp is set around Harrow Road and features it prominently.

In one version of the Bus Driver's Prayer, the line from The Lord's Prayer, "Hallowed be thy name" is replaced with "Harrow Road be thy name."

In Sam Selvon's 1956 Lonely Londoners, the newly migrated Tanty lives in Harrow Road. The novel explores the clash of cultures, as she lives in this part of London "like how some people live in small village and never go to 'the city.'"

In the DJ_Khaled track "God Did" from August 2022, Jay-Z mentions Harrow Road in the line "And bloke and 'nem from London, Harrow Road, Weston Inn" which Jay-Z later discussed in a podcast with Asher D. Irish Hop-hop band Kneecap have a song titled Harrow Road on their 2024 album Fine Art.
