= The Flora =

Pub in Kensal Green, London

Coordinates: 51.526973°N 0.212736°W

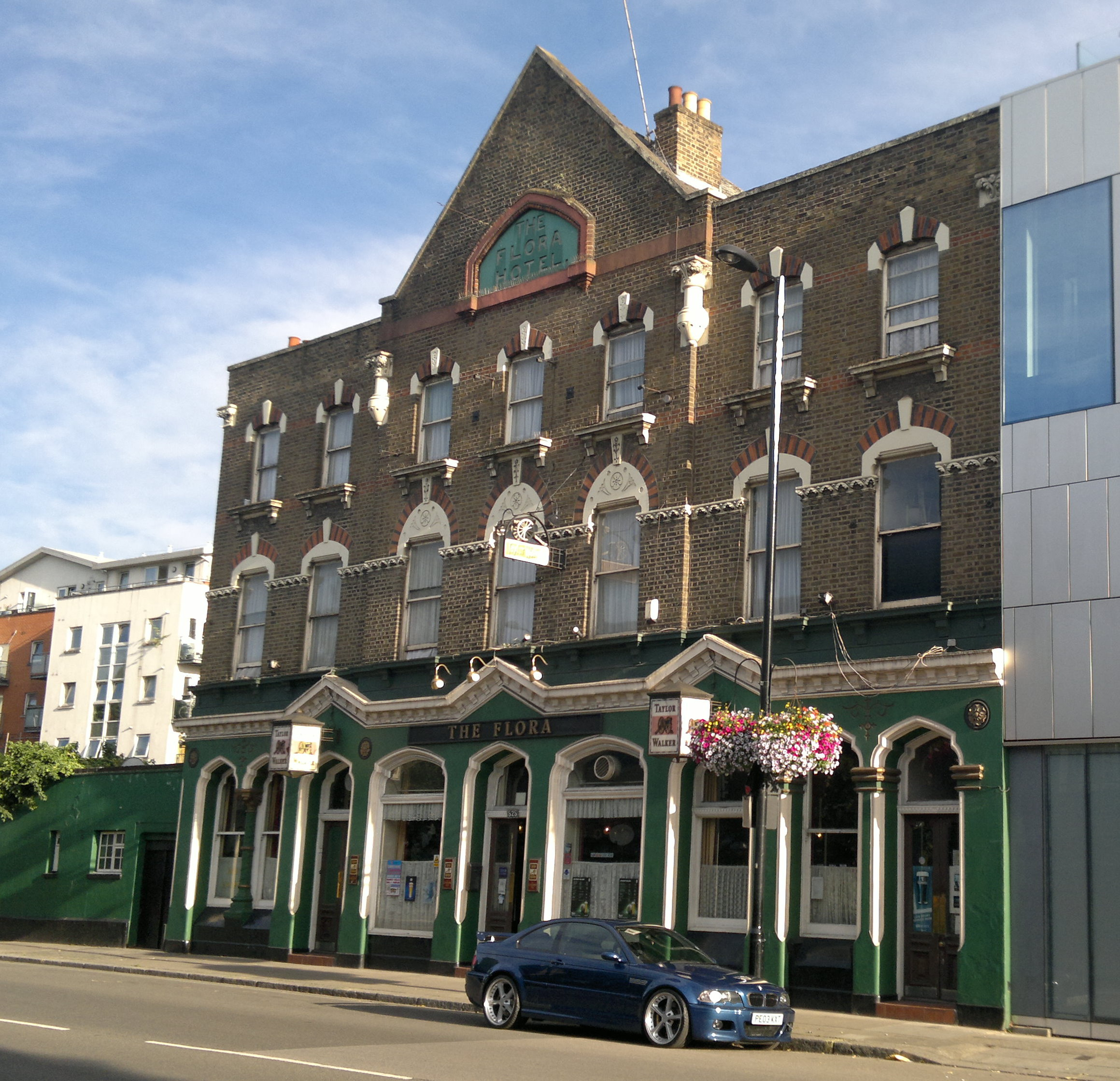
The Flora

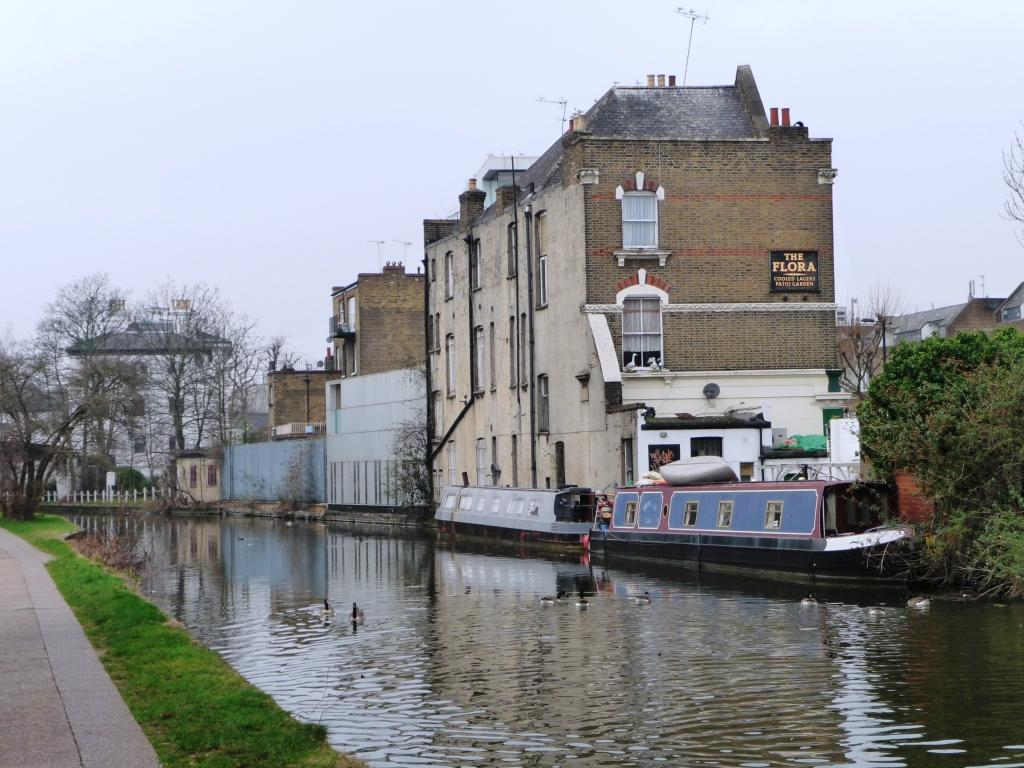
The rear of The Flora, seen from the Grand Union Canal.

The Flora, also known as The Flora Hotel, is a pub at 525 Harrow Road, Kensal Green, London W10. It backs onto the Grand Union Canal. It is a Taylor Walker pub.

As of December 2017, the pub is closed and boarded up. Planning consent has been given to convert the upper floors into residential use, a roof extension, and a five-storey building where the beer garden was, and with the ground floor to continue as a pub.

== Design ==
The Flora was built in the 19th century from polychrome brick, and Pevsner notes its "angular window heads". The building is also notable for the contrasting brickwork above the windows and the floral motifs incorporated into the design.

== History ==
The pub was known as The Flora Arms in at least 1881 and 1896. In the nineteenth century, as The Flora Hotel, the building was the location for a number of inquests into deaths in the Kensal Green area. Thomas Robinson Dipple was the publican for many years, from at least 1904 to 1921. Sometimes described as an "Irish" pub due to the large Irish community in the area, in the twentieth century the pub has been a favourite watering hole for supporters of the local football team Queen's Park Rangers.
