= A404 road =

Road from London to Berkshire

A404

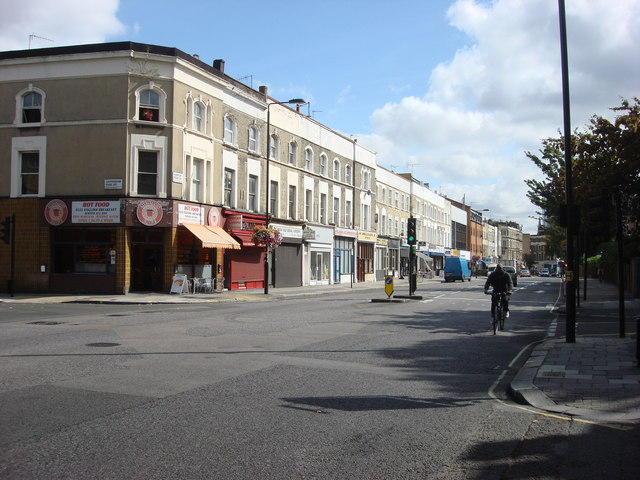
- A404 Harrow Road, at junction with Chippenham Road on the left, London W9

Route information
- Length: 44.6 mi (71.8 km)

Major junctions
- From: A40 (Westway) in Marylebone, London
- A219; A406; A312; A410; A412; A413; A416; A355; A40; A308; A4; M25; M40; M4

- To: A404(M) at Maidenhead

Location
- Country: United Kingdom
- Primary destinations: Wembley, Harrow, Northwood, Rickmansworth, Amersham, High Wycombe, Marlow

Road network
- Roads in the United Kingdom; Motorways; A and B road zones

The A404 is a road in the United Kingdom that starts at Paddington in London, heads northwest towards Rickmansworth, then on to Amersham before turning back southwest through High Wycombe, and terminating near Maidenhead in Berkshire. It is 44.6 miles (71.8 km) long.

== Route ==
The road initially follows a course through north-west London via Harlesden, Wembley, Harrow, Northwood and Rickmansworth. At times during this stage it is known as Harrow Road. It crosses the M25 at Junction 18 at Chorleywood, crossing into Buckinghamshire and then continues towards Little Chalfont and Amersham.

Between Harrow and Amersham, the road closely follows the route of the London – Harrow-on-the-Hill – Aylesbury railway lines, London to Aylesbury line from Marylebone, and runs near several stations along that line.

At Amersham Common, the road turns south-west and continues in that direction joining the Amersham by-pass (A413) for a short distance, and then proceeds towards High Wycombe. After passing through the town centre, where it crosses the A40, it changes to a dual carriageway for the climb up Marlow Hill to reach the M40 at Junction 4 (Handy Cross), and continues as a dual carriageway past Marlow and Bisham.

The road eventually becomes the A404(M) at Maidenhead Thicket. It then runs a short distance towards the M4 where the A404(M) finally terminates at Junction 8/9.

== Harrow Road ==
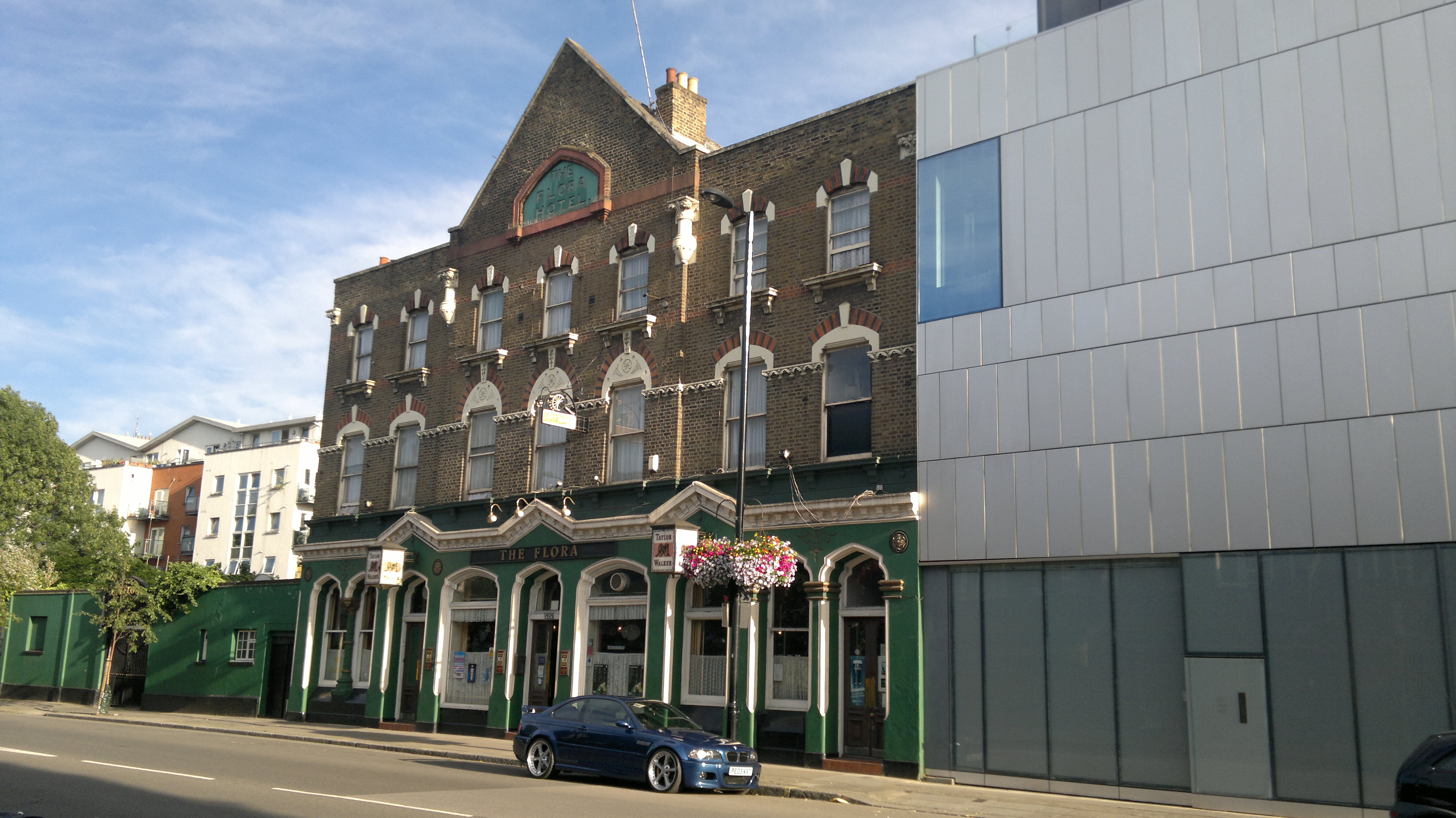
The Flora, 525 Harrow Road

The Harrow Road is an ancient route in North West London which runs from Paddington in a northwesterly direction towards Harrow. It is also the name given to the immediate surrounding area of Queens Park and Kensal Green, straddling the NW10, W10, W2 and W9 postcodes. With minor deviations in the 19th and 20th centuries, the route remains otherwise unaltered.

Harrow Road is also a ward of the City of Westminster. The population of this ward at the 2011 Census was 12,034.

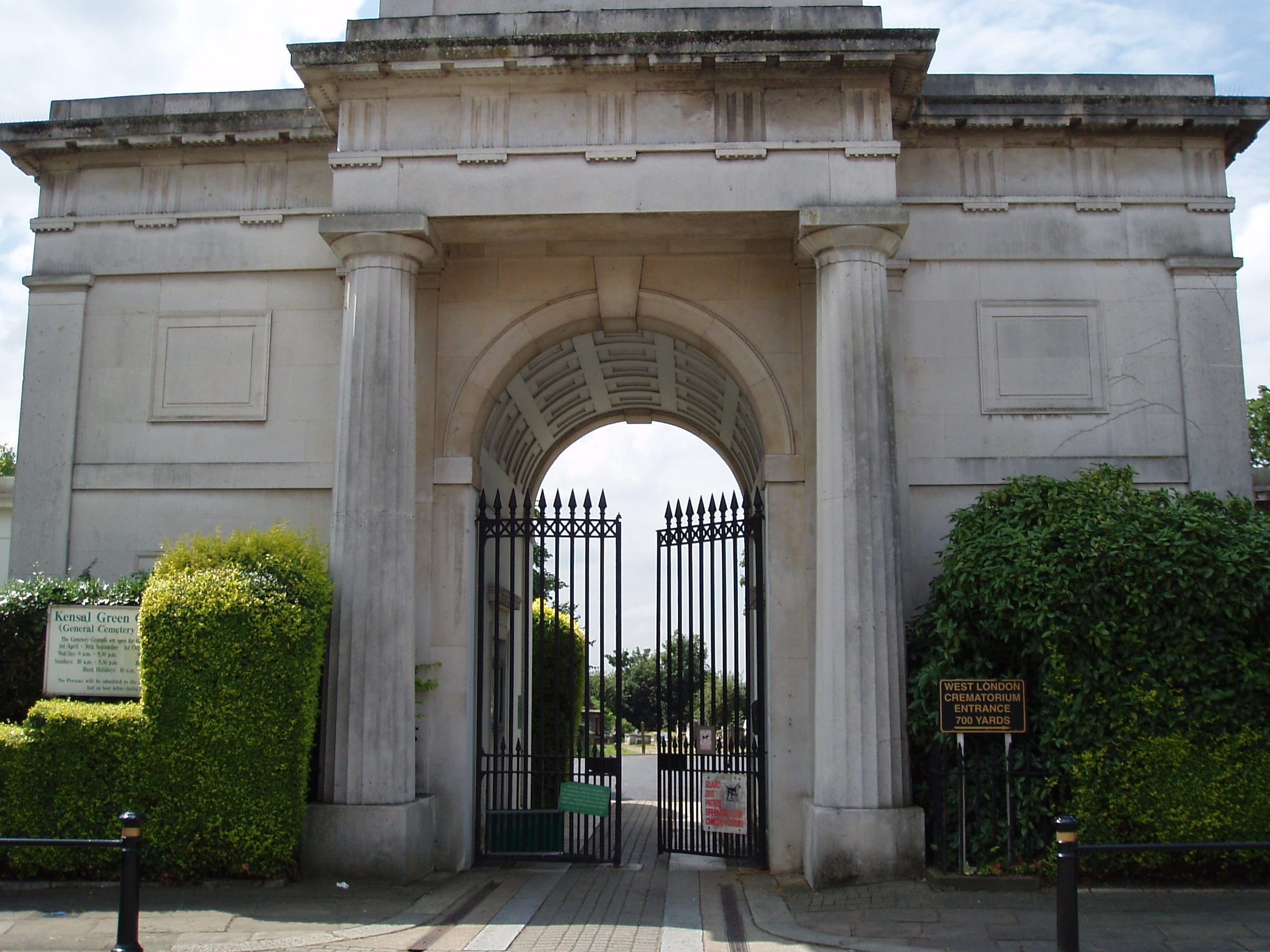
The main entrance of Kensal Green Cemetery, on Harrow Road

=== History ===
By the 19th century, Harrow Road had become the main street in Paddington.

In the 20th century, many properties along Harrow Road were developed into high-rise social housing, though some 19th-century houses and commercial buildings north of the Paddington Basin were retained. These included Elgin Towers, constructed between 1966 and 1969, and demolished in 1994.

=== Cultural references ===
The 1950 film The Blue Lamp is set around Harrow Road and features it prominently.

In one version of the Bus Driver's Prayer, the line from The Lord's Prayer, "Hallowed be thy name" is replaced with "Harrow Road be thy name."

== A404(M) ==
A404(M)
- A404(M) highlighted in blue
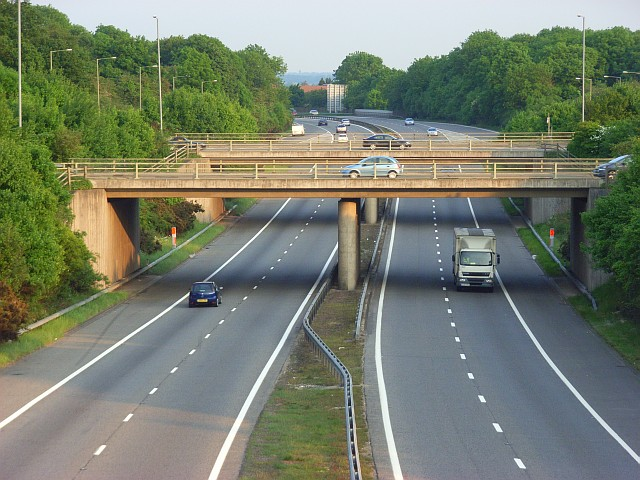
- The northern end of the A404(M)

Route information
- Maintained by National Highways
- Length: 2.4 mi (3.9 km)
- Existed: 1961–present

Major junctions
- Northeast end: Maidenhead (west)
- M4 motorway A308(M) motorway J9b ->A4 road
- Southwest end: M4 Junction 8/9

Location
- Country: United Kingdom
- Primary destinations: Maidenhead, (High Wycombe), (Henley), (Marlow)

Road network
- Roads in the United Kingdom; Motorways; A and B road zones

The A404(M) is a motorway in Berkshire, England and can be referred to as the Maidenhead and Marlow Bypass or M4/M40 link road. It joins the M4 with the A404 dual carriageway to High Wycombe, Marlow and the M40. It was originally known as the A423(M) until the A423 between Maidenhead and Oxford was reclassified as the A4130.

=== History ===
The road was originally opened in 1961, as part of the A4(M) Maidenhead Bypass, which ran from the existing Junction 7, through a junction with the A308 and ending at a junction with the A4. In 1963, the Slough bypass was opened to Junction 7, and the A4(M) was renumbered M4, Junction 8 being with the A308 and Junction 9 with the A4.

The proposed route of the M4 was then changed to go south of Reading, instead of north of it. When the M4 was extended in 1971, a new junction was provided to connect with what would become a spur. As this new interchange was built too close to the existing Junction 8, this had to be closed. A new spur, the A308(M), was built to maintain access to the A308 and connected with the A404(M) and the M4 at the same grade separated roundabout. This new junction was numbered 8/9 so as not to confuse motorists and the interchange with the A4 became Junction 9A. The old M4 was renumbered A423(M) as it was a direct continuation of the A423 to Oxford.

=== Junctions ===
A404(M) motorway junctions
Northbound exits	Junction	Southbound exits
Road continues as A404 to Marlow and Wycombe; Oxford (M40) and Henley (A4130)	A404; Terminus; J9B	Reading, Maidenhead A4; Reading, Slough, Windsor (M4) A404(M)
Reading, Maidenhead A4	A404; Terminus; J9B	Start of motorway
Cox Green, White Waltham	J9A	Cox Green, White Waltham
Start of motorway High Wycombe, Henley, Maidenhead (West) A404(M)	A308(M); M4 J8/9	Maidenhead A308(M); South Wales, Reading M4(W); London, Windsor, Slough M4(E)
