= Wycombe District Council elections =

Local government elections in Buckinghamshire, England

Wycombe District Council in Buckinghamshire, England was elected every four years from 1973 until 2020. From the last boundary changes in 2003 until its abolition in 2020, 60 councillors were elected from 28 wards.

== Political control ==
From the first election to the council in 1973 until its merger into Buckinghamshire Council in 2020, political control of the council was held by the following parties:

Party in control	Years
Conservative	1973–1995
No overall control	1995–1999
Conservative	1999–2020

=== Leadership ===
The leaders of the council from 1999 until its abolition in 2020 were:

Councillor	Party	From	To
Pam Priestley	Conservative	1999	May 2001
Roger Colomb	Conservative	14 May 2001	19 May 2003
Lesley Clarke	Conservative	19 May 2003	May 2011
Alex Collingwood	Conservative	24 May 2011	13 May 2013
Richard Scott	Conservative	13 May 2013	May 2015
Katrina Wood	Conservative	26 May 2015	31 Mar 2020

== Council elections ==
- 1973 Wycombe District Council election
- 1976 Wycombe District Council election
- 1979 Wycombe District Council election
- 1983 Wycombe District Council election (New ward boundaries)
- 1987 Wycombe District Council election (District boundary changes took place but the number of seats remained the same)
- 1991 Wycombe District Council election (District boundary changes took place but the number of seats remained the same)
- 1995 Wycombe District Council election
- 1999 Wycombe District Council election
- 2003 Wycombe District Council election (New ward boundaries)
- 2007 Wycombe District Council election
- 2011 Wycombe District Council election
- 2015 Wycombe District Council election

== Council composition ==
Year	Conservative	Labour	Liberal Democrats	UKIP	East Wycombe Independents	Independent	Council control after election
2003	46	9	2	0	0	3	Conservative
2007	49	5	4	0	0	2	Conservative
2011	42	7	8	1	0	2	Conservative
2015	47	6	1	1	3	2	Conservative

== Results maps ==
2003 results map

2007 results map

2011 results map

2015 results map

== By-election results ==
=== 1993–1999 ===
Marsh & Micklefield By-Election 4 February 1993
Party	Candidate	Votes	%	±%
Labour	Ann Bennett	689	49.36	
Liberal Democrats	Ian Morton	417	29.87	
Conservative	Sue Heath	290	20.77	
Majority		272	19.49	
Turnout		1396	25	
Labour hold		Swing		

Marsh & Micklefield By-Election 30 October 1997
Party	Candidate	Votes	%	±%
Labour	Kathleen Draper	375	48.6	−12.5
Conservative		319	43.3	+29.8
Liberal Democrats		77	10.0	−15.4
Majority		56	5.3	
Turnout		771		
Labour hold		Swing		

Lane End & Piddington By-Election 23 April 1998
Party	Candidate	Votes	%	±%
Liberal Democrats		408	46.2	+9.7
Conservative		390	44.1	+11.7
Labour		86	9.7	−21.4
Majority		18	2.1	
Turnout		884		
Liberal Democrats hold		Swing		

=== 1999–2003 ===
Great Marlow By-Election 7 June 2001
Party	Candidate	Votes	%	±%
Conservative		434	55.9	−0.7
Independent		342	44.1	+0.7
Majority		92	11.8	
Turnout		776		
Conservative hold		Swing		

Hambledon Valley By-Election 29 November 2001
Party	Candidate	Votes	%	±%
Conservative	Roger Emmett	326	49.9	−20.5
Independent		200	30.6	+30.6
Labour		127	19.4	−10.2
Majority		126	19.3	
Turnout		653	34.0	
Conservative hold		Swing		

Hazlemere West By-Election 11 July 2002
Party	Candidate	Votes	%	±%
Conservative	Bob Bate	542	78.0	+11.7
Labour	Trevor Snaith	153	22.0	−11.7
Majority		389	56.0	
Turnout		695	29.1	
Conservative hold		Swing		

=== 2003–2007 ===
Tylers Green and Loudwater By-Election 5 May 2005
Party	Candidate	Votes	%	±%
Conservative	David Bainton	2,172	54.1	+5.4
Liberal Democrats	Ian Forbes	1,092	27.2	+5.6
Labour	Ian Bates	748	18.6	+7.9
Majority		1,080	26.9	
Turnout		4,012	62.8	
Conservative hold		Swing		

The Wooburns By-Election 30 June 2005
Party	Candidate	Votes	%	±%
Conservative	Simon Bazley	404	74.5	+39.0
Independent	Jonathan Ashman	138	25.5	−18.5
Majority		266	49.0	
Turnout		542		
Conservative gain from Independent		Swing		

Chiltern Rise By-Election 17 November 2005
Party	Candidate	Votes	%	±%
Conservative	Ian McEnnis	357	47.4	+8.2
Liberal Democrats	Neil Timberlake	316	42.0	+10.9
Labour	Ian Bates	80	10.6	+10.6
Majority		41	5.4	
Turnout		753	18.8	
Conservative hold		Swing		

Greater Marlow By-Election 2 March 2006
Party	Candidate	Votes	%	±%
Conservative	Helen Wilkinson-Makey	491	56.4	+14.8
Liberal Democrats	Ivor Coleman	244	28.0	+28.0
Labour	Janet Pritchard	135	15.5	+15.5
Majority		247	28.4	
Turnout		870	22.4	
Conservative gain from Independent		Swing		

Tylers Green & Loudwater By-Election 20 April 2006
Party	Candidate	Votes	%	±%
Conservative	Katrina Wood	888	65.8	+17.1
Liberal Democrats	Ian Forbes	387	28.7	+7.1
Labour	Sadia Hussain	75	5.6	−5.1
Majority		501	37.1	
Turnout		1,350	21.6	
Conservative hold		Swing		

Great Hughenden By-Election 9 November 2006
Party	Candidate	Votes	%	±%
Conservative	Larry Haig	1,040	65.4	+9.7
Liberal Democrats	William Barnes	549	34.6	+4.7
Majority		491	30.8	
Turnout		1,589	24.3	
Conservative hold		Swing		

=== 2007–2011 ===
Marlow North and West By-Election 7 February 2008
Party	Candidate	Votes	%	±%
Conservative	Richard Scott	928	61.1	+3.6
Liberal Democrats	Carol Cummins	382	25.1	−8.4
Labour	Paul Mansell	209	13.8	+4.9
Majority		546	36.0	
Turnout		1,519	22.6	
Conservative hold		Swing		

Totteridge By-Election 23 April 2009
Party	Candidate	Votes	%	±%
Liberal Democrats	Steve Guy	733	54.1	+36.5
Conservative	Tim Hewish	408	30.1	−10.9
Labour	Ian Bates	214	15.8	−25.6
Majority		325	24.0	
Turnout		1,355	31.0	
Liberal Democrats gain from Labour		Swing		

Totteridge By-Election 6 May 2010
Party	Candidate	Votes	%	±%
Liberal Democrats	Jen Joseph	1,234	44.5	+26.9
Conservative	Lakshan Wanigasooriya	1,017	36.6	−4.4
Labour	Ian Bates	524	18.9	−22.5
Majority		217	7.8	
Turnout		2,775		
Liberal Democrats gain from Conservative		Swing		

Greater Marlow By-Election 15 July 2010
Party	Candidate	Votes	%	±%
Conservative	Dominic Barnes	609	52.9	+17.1
Independent	Mike Harris	348	30.2	+30.2
Liberal Democrats	Kavita Mohan	195	16.9	+0.0
Majority		261	22.7	
Turnout		1,152		
Conservative hold		Swing		

=== 2011–2015 ===
Hazlemere South By-Election 24 November 2011
Party	Candidate	Votes	%	±%
Liberal Democrats	Alex Slater	412	37.7	+19.0
UKIP	Brian Mapletoft	365	33.4	+33.4
Conservative	Lawrence Wood	228	20.9	−33.8
Labour	Alan De'Ath	88	8.1	+8.1
Majority		47	4.3	
Turnout		1,093		
Liberal Democrats gain from Conservative		Swing		

Disraeli By-Election 2 May 2013
Party	Candidate	Votes	%	±%
Conservative	Maz Hussain	553	40.0	+3.3
Labour	Mohammed Rafiq	466	33.7	−9.9
UKIP	Vijay Singh Srao	234	16.9	+16.9
Liberal Democrats	Andrew Stevens	129	9.3	−10.4
Majority		87	6.3	
Turnout		1,382		
Conservative gain from Labour		Swing		

Hambleden Valley By-Election 5 September 2013
Party	Candidate	Votes	%	±%
Conservative	Roger Metcalfe	379	70.3	−9.8
UKIP	Brian Mapletoft	97	18.0	+18.0
Labour	Julian Grigg	63	11.7	+11.7
Majority		282	52.3	
Turnout		539		
Conservative hold		Swing		
