= Steve Lall =

- Born: 8 January 1944 (age 82)
- Occupations: Ex-fighter pilot, former tea planter, conservationist
- Known for: Jilling Estate, conservation
- Spouse: Parvati Lall
- Children: Nandani Lall
- Website: www.jilling.net

Steve Lall (born 8 Jan 1944) is a former fighter pilot (Indian Air Force) and tea planter who turned his back to modern life in Delhi for a farmer's life in the Himalayan mountains and protagonist of episode two of season two of English broadcaster Ben Fogle's television program Ben Fogle: New Lives in the Wild. Lall has battled for decades to protect wilderness in Jilling near Nainital in Uttarakhand, India.

Lall runs Jilling Estate along with his wife Parvati and daughter Nandini. The estate is spread over 120 acres (49 ha) of farmland. The estate consists of natural forests with rhododendron, oak, chestnut, apricot and pine trees.
