= Wycombe Rural District =

Former local government area in the UK

Coordinates: 51.65°N 0.78°W

Wycombe
- Rural district
- Area
  - 1911: 71,716 acres (112.056 sq mi; 290.22 km^{2})
  - 1931: 64,357 acres (100.558 sq mi; 260.44 km^{2})
  - 1961: 71,232 acres (111.300 sq mi; 288.27 km^{2})
- Population
  - 1901: 22,910
  - 1931: 27,694
  - 1971: 71,331
- History
  - Origin: Rural sanitary district
  - Created: 28 December 1894
  - Abolished: 31 March 1974
  - Succeeded by: Wycombe District
- Status: Rural district
- Government: Wycombe Rural District Council
  - HQ: High Wycombe

Wycombe Rural District was, from 1894 to 1974, a rural district in the administrative county of Buckinghamshire, England.

== Origins ==
The district had its origins in the Wycombe Poor Law Union, which had been created in 1835, covering High Wycombe and several surrounding parishes. In 1872 sanitary districts were established, giving public health and local government responsibilities for rural areas to the existing boards of guardians of poor law unions. The Wycombe Rural Sanitary District therefore covered the area of the poor law union except for the town of High Wycombe, which was a municipal borough (officially called Chepping Wycombe until 1946) and so became its own urban sanitary district. The Wycombe Rural Sanitary District was administered from Wycombe Union Workhouse, which had been built in 1843 in open countryside in the parish of Saunderton, nearly five miles north-west of High Wycombe.

Under the Local Government Act 1894, rural sanitary districts became rural districts from 28 December 1894. The Wycombe Rural District Council held its first meeting on 31 December 1894 at the workhouse. William Morris was appointed the first chairman of the council.

== Area and parishes ==
The district consisted of a number of rural parishes surrounding High Wycombe. In 1934 it was enlarged, when a county review order added the area of the abolished Hambleden Rural District.

Parish	Changes
Bledlow	Merged with Saunderton 1934
Bledlow cum Saunderton	Formed by the merger of two parishes in 1934
Bradenham	
Chepping Wycombe Rural	Renamed Chepping Wycombe 1949
Ellesborough	
Fawley	Transferred from Hambleden RD 1934
Fingest	Renamed Fingest and Lane End 1937
Great and Little Hampden	Parishes had been merged in 1885
Great and Little Kimble	Parishes had been merged in 1885
Great Marlow	Part of parish became Marlow Urban District in 1897
Hambleden	Transferred from Hambleden RD 1934
Hedsor	
Horsenden	Abolished 1934: area split between Bledlow cum Saunderton and Princes Risborough
Hughenden	
Ibstone	
Ilmer	Abolished 1934: formed part of Longwick cum Ilmer
Lacey Green	Formed 1934 from part of Princes Risborough
Little Marlow	
Little Missenden	Transferred to Amersham Rural District 1901
Longwick cum Ilmer	Formed 1934 by merger of Ilmer and Monks Risborough (with parts Princes Risborough of Towersey)
Medmenham	Transferred from Hambleden RD 1934
Monks Risborough	abolished 1934, most passed to new parish of Longwick cum Ilmer
Princes Risborough	
Radnage	
Saunderton	Merged with Bledlow 1934
Stokenchurch	Transferred from Oxfordshire 1895
Turville	
West Wycombe	Abolished 1934, with part added to enlarged Borough of Chepping Wycombe, remainder to West Wycombe Rural
West Wycombe Rural	Formed 1934 from the part of West Wycombe not added to the borough with part of Hughenden
Wooburn	

== Premises ==
The council continued to be based at the workhouse in Saunderton until the First World War, when the building was taken over for military purposes. Meetings were held at High Wycombe Guildhall for the next few years, with staff based at various offices. In 1928 the council acquired 17 High Street in High Wycombe, converting it to become their offices and meeting place. The council remained based at 17 High Street until 1967, when it moved to a newly built office building called Bellfield House at 80 Oxford Road in High Wycombe. The council remained at Bellfield House until its abolition in 1974.

== Abolition ==
Wycombe Rural District was abolished under the Local Government Act 1972, merging with the borough of High Wycombe and Marlow Urban District to become Wycombe District. Bellfield House was used as secondary offices for the new council for some years, but was subsequently demolished in the early 2000s.
