= Animal Park =

Television documentary about keepers and animals at Longleat Safari Park, UK

- Title screen
- Presented by: Kate Humble; Ben Fogle (2001–present); Hamza Yassin (2021–present); Megan McCubbin (2022–present); Paul Heiney (2000); Jean Johansson (2016–2021)
- Theme music composer: Simon May
- Country of origin: United Kingdom
- Original language: English
- No. of series: 21 (main series); 2 (Wild in Africa); 1 (Wild on the West Coast)
- No. of episodes: 286 (main series); 25 (Wild in Africa); 10 (Wild on the West Coast)

Production
- Production location: Longleat Safari Park
- Running time: 15–60 minutes
- Production companies: BBC, Endemol UK

Original release
- Network: BBC One (2000–2002, 2016–present); BBC Two (2004–2009)
- Release: 10 July 2000 – 25 March 2009
- Release: 22 August 2016 – present

Related
- The Lions of Longleat; Lion Country

Animal Park is a BBC television documentary series about the lives of keepers and animals at Longleat Safari and Adventure Park, Wiltshire, England. The show is presented by Kate Humble, Ben Fogle and Megan McCubbin, with appearances by members of Longleat staff and the landowners, the Thynn family.

As of August 2025, there have been 21 series of the programme as well as three special series, usually shown during school holidays and broadcast on weekdays in the daytime as daily episodes.

== Content ==
Programmes show the animals, keepers, and day-to-day running of the safari park. Some of the animals captured the hearts of the viewing public, including the tiger 'Kadu', rhinos 'Babs' and 'Winston', and Europe's oldest male silverback gorilla, 'Nico'.

Alexander Thynn, 7th Marquess of Bath, owner of the Longleat estate until his death on 4 April 2020, appeared regularly in the show. Animal Park also documents the running of Longleat House and the ongoing preservation of its historic contents.

== History ==
=== Predecessors ===
The Lions of Longleat is a 1967 BBC One documentary about the newly opened safari park with commentary by Lord Bath and Jimmy Chipperfield. Another series, Lion Country, aired between 1998 and 1999 with a total of 55 episodes.

=== Original series ===
The first series of Animal Park, originally broadcast in 2000 on BBC One, was presented by Kate Humble and Paul Heiney. In series two, Heiney was replaced by Ben Fogle. Altogether, there were nine series and 150 episodes of Animal Park, with the last episode originally airing on 25 March 2009.

=== Spin-offs ===
There have been two spin-offs from the main series. Animal Park: Wild in Africa was originally broadcast in 2005 on BBC Two. Set in Namibia, it documented the work of wildlife conservationists.

Another spin-off, Animal Park: Wild on the West Coast, had a similar format in California, and was originally broadcast in 2007 on BBC Two.

=== 2016 revival ===
In 2016, the BBC announced that Animal Park would return for a tenth series to celebrate the 50th anniversary of Longleat Safari Park. This series aired for five episodes in August 2016 in a daytime slot. The show was renamed Animal Park: Summer Special and was presented by Kate Humble and Ben Fogle, with Jean Johansson as a reporter.

An eleventh series was broadcast in 2017. Five episodes aired during Easter, with a further ten airing during the summer.

Animal Park: Summer Special, series twelve, was aired in August 2018. Episode 3 celebrated the life of the gorilla 'Nico', who died in January 2018 at the age of 56. Episode 7 featured wildlife photographer Will Burrard-Lucas, who used his remote-control BeetleCam to take a series of close-up photographs of the animals.

Humble and Fogle continued as presenters for the 2019 and 2020 series.

Series fourteen, episode 4 (first aired in August 2020) celebrated the life of the former owner of the Longleat estate, Alexander Thynn, 7th Marquess of Bath, who died in April 2020. His son Ceawlin Thynn, 8th Marquess and his wife Emma have since appeared on several episodes.

Series fifteen, aired in December 2020, had a Christmas theme. In 2021, wildlife cameraman Hamza Yassin joined the presenting team.

Series seventeen aired in August 2022, with Megan McCubbin replacing Johansson.

== Transmissions ==
=== Main series ===
Series	Start date	End date	Episodes	Channel
1	10 July 2000	21 July 2000	10	BBC One
2	9 July 2001	20 July 2001	10	BBC One
3	7 May 2002	26 August 2002	25	BBC One
4	23 February 2004	26 March 2004	25	BBC Two
5	6 September 2004	13 October 2004	25	BBC Two
6	22 August 2005	9 September 2005	15	BBC Two
7	21 August 2006	8 September 2006	15	BBC Two
8	7 January 2008	20 January 2008	10	BBC Two
9	5 January 2009	25 March 2009	15	BBC Two
10	22 August 2016	26 August 2016	5	BBC One
11	10 April 2017	11 August 2017	15	BBC One
12	6 August 2018	24 August 2018	15	BBC One
13	5 August 2019	23 August 2019	15	BBC One
14	17 August 2020	4 September 2020	15	BBC One
15	14 December 2020	18 December 2020	6	BBC One
16	9 August 2021	27 August 2021	15	BBC One
17	8 August 2022	25 August 2022	15	BBC One
18	7 August 2023	25 August 2023	15	BBC One
19	12 August 2024	23 August 2024	10	BBC One
20	16 December 2024	20 December 2024	5	BBC One
21	28 July 2025	15 August 2025	15	BBC One

Some episodes from series six and eight have been re-edited into 15, 25, 30 and 45-minute programmes to be repeated and used as schedule fillers.

=== Animal Park: Wild in Africa ===
Series	Start date	End date	Episodes	Channel
1	4 April 2005	6 May 2005	10	BBC Two
2	27 February 2006	17 March 2006	15	BBC Two

=== Animal Park: Wild on the West Coast ===
Series	Start date	End date	Episodes	Channel
1	23 July 2007	6 August 2007	10	BBC Two
