= Isabelle Jane Foulkes =

Deaf artist, designer and campaigner (1970–2001)

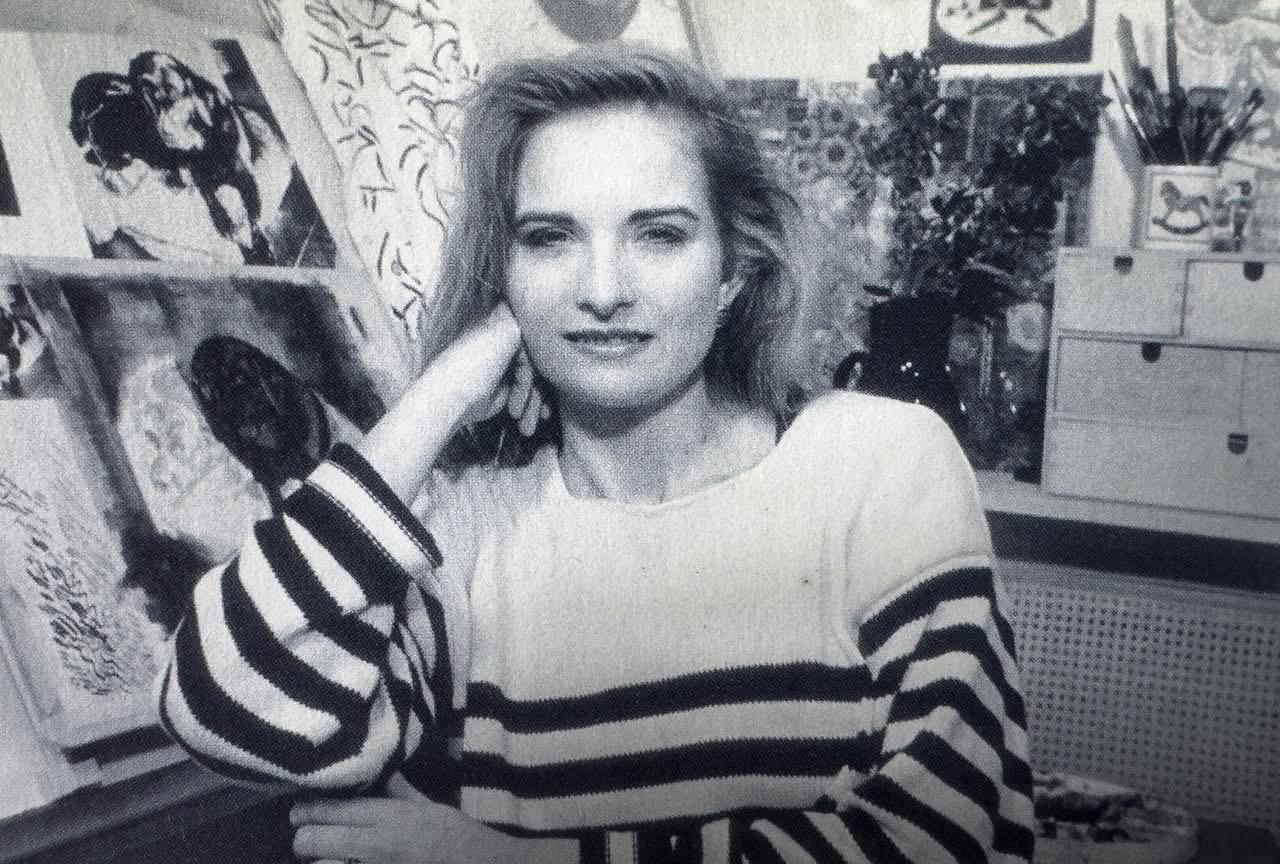
- Born: 12 July 1970; Worcester, England
- Died: 31 October 2001 (aged 31); Colwyn Bay, Conwy, Wales
- Education: Bretton Hall Art College; Manchester Metropolitan University
- Occupations: Artist, textile designer and disability campaigner

Isabelle "Issi" Jane Foulkes (née Craven; 12 July 1970 – 31 October 2001) was an Anglo-Welsh artist, textile designer and disability campaigner. She designed the Welsh fingerspelling alphabet and worked with charities including Hearing Dogs for Deaf People, and the Conwy Deaf Society.

== Early life and education ==
Isabelle Jane Craven was born in 1970 in Worcester to Welsh parents, and known as Issi. She was born with cystic fibrosis and became deaf as a result of medication administered for a chest infection whilst very young. As a child she learnt British Sign Language (BSL).

She was educated at Bretton Hall Art College, affiliated to Leeds University, before studying a BA (Hons) degree in Art and Design and a Masters (MA) in Textiles at Manchester Metropolitan University. She met her future husband, Gareth Foulkes, at Manchester Deaf Club on Halloween, and after they married she took his surname.

== Career ==
After moving to Conway in North Wales, Foulkes began to learn the Welsh language at evening classes. She campaigned for recognition of BSL and was supported by a hearing dog called Hiro, provided by Hearing Dogs for Deaf People.

She designed the Welsh fingerspelling alphabet and a colourful poster that was distributed to all schools across the six counties of north Wales. She worked with charities including Hearing Dogs for Deaf People, and the Conwy Deaf Society, and created designs for the British Deaf Association (BDA) and the Royal National Institute for Deaf People (RNID) which helped raise awareness of deaf culture. Her artwork and textiles were exhibited in Cardiff, Liverpool, London and Manchester.

Foulkes had a double lung transplant in 1999 but her body eventually rejected the organs. She died on 31 October 2001 in Colwyn Bay, Conwy.
