= Marlow Urban District =

Defunct English administrative area

Coordinates: 51.566667°N 0.766667°W

Marlow Great Marlow (1896–1897)
- Urban District
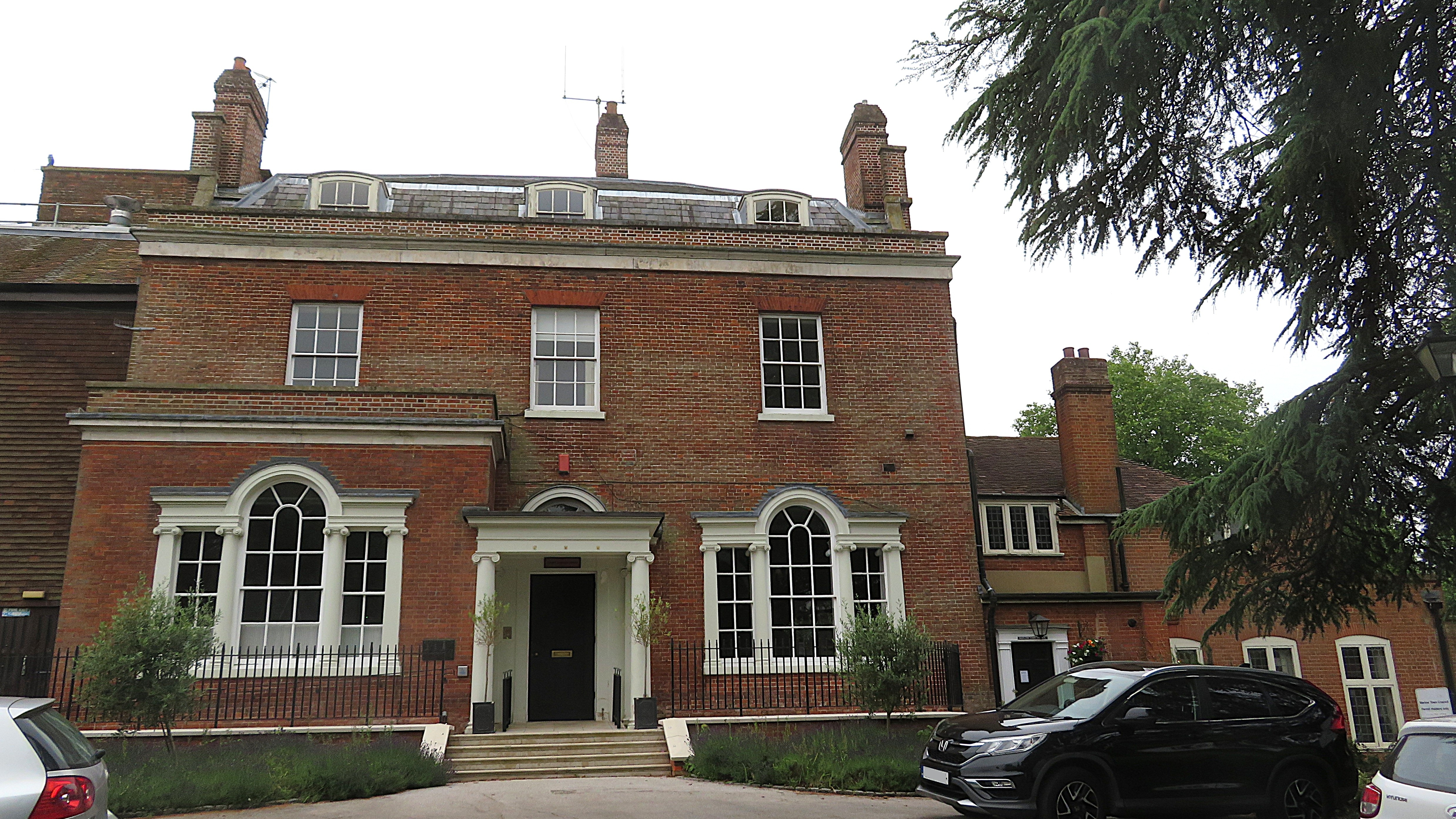
- Court Garden, Pound Lane, Marlow: Council headquarters 1934-1974
- Area
  - 1911: 968 acres (3.9 km^{2})
  - 1961: 1,661 acres (6.7 km^{2})
- Population
  - 1901: 4,526
  - 1971: 11,700
- History
  - Created: 1 October 1896
  - Abolished: 31 March 1974
  - Succeeded by: Wycombe

Marlow Urban District was a local government authority in the administrative county of Buckinghamshire, England, between 1896 and 1974, covering the town of Marlow.

== Origins ==
When parish and district councils were established in December 1894 under the Local Government Act 1894, the parish of Great Marlow was included in the Wycombe Rural District, which met at Wycombe Union Workhouse in Saunderton. Shortly after the new districts were established, the process began for creating a separate urban district to cover the town of Marlow. It was decided that the whole parish of Great Marlow was not suitable to be an urban district. Instead, it was decided to split it into two parishes: "Marlow (Urban)", covering the built-up area of the town, and a parish which would retain the name "Great Marlow", covering the more rural parts of the old parish. The reduced Great Marlow parish would stay in the Wycombe Rural District, whilst the new Marlow (Urban) parish would be governed by an urban district council, which was initially called "Great Marlow Urban District Council". These changes took effect on 1 October 1896.

After elections, the Great Marlow Urban District Council held its first meeting on 22 October 1896 at the town's Police Court on Trinity Road, which had also been the meeting place of the former (pre-split) Great Marlow Parish Council. Walter Lovegrove was appointed the first chairman of the urban district council.

At its third meeting on 1 December 1896, the new urban district council resolved to request a change of name from "Great Marlow" to "Marlow". The fact of there being a "Great Marlow Urban District Council" covering the town itself and also a "Great Marlow Parish Council" covering the rural areas around the town was causing confusion, as was the mismatch between the name of the urban district being "Great Marlow Urban District" but the parish it contained being "Marlow (Urban)". The change of name was agreed by Buckinghamshire County Council and came into force on 11 February 1897.

== Premises ==
For the first few months, the council met at the Police Court on Trinity Road. From March 1897 until 1934 the council met at the Marlow Institute at 7 Institute Road. Administrative functions were carried out at the offices of the solicitor who acted as clerk to the council, at 41 High Street.

In 1926 a large eighteenth century house called Court Garden on Pound Lane was bought by public subscription, and the grounds turned into a public park called Higginson Park in honour of General Sir George Higginson, one of the town's most celebrated residents, who had his 100th birthday that year. The house was then owned by a charitable trust set up for the purpose. In 1933 the council agreed to lease the house and convert it to become its offices and meeting place. After renovations, the council moved to Court Garden House in 1934 and remained based there until its abolition in 1974. The council took over the ownership of the house and park in 1955.

== Abolition ==
Marlow Urban District was abolished under the Local Government Act 1972, with the area becoming part of Wycombe District on 1 April 1974. A successor parish was established to cover the former urban district, with its council taking the name Marlow Town Council. The town council continues to be based at Court Garden House.
