= 2011 Wycombe District Council election =

Local election in Wycombe, UK

Map of the 2011 results

Elections to Wycombe District Council were held on 5 May 2011, alongside other local elections across the United Kingdom. Following the election the council remained under Conservative control.

== Results summary ==
2011 Wycombe District Council election
Party	Seats Before	Change	Seats After
Conservative Party	44	▼2	42
Liberal Democrats	9	▼1	8
Labour Party	2	▲5	7
Others	5	▼2	3

== See also ==
- Wycombe District Council elections
