= Ben Fogle =

English broadcaster (born 1973)

Ben Fogle FRGS
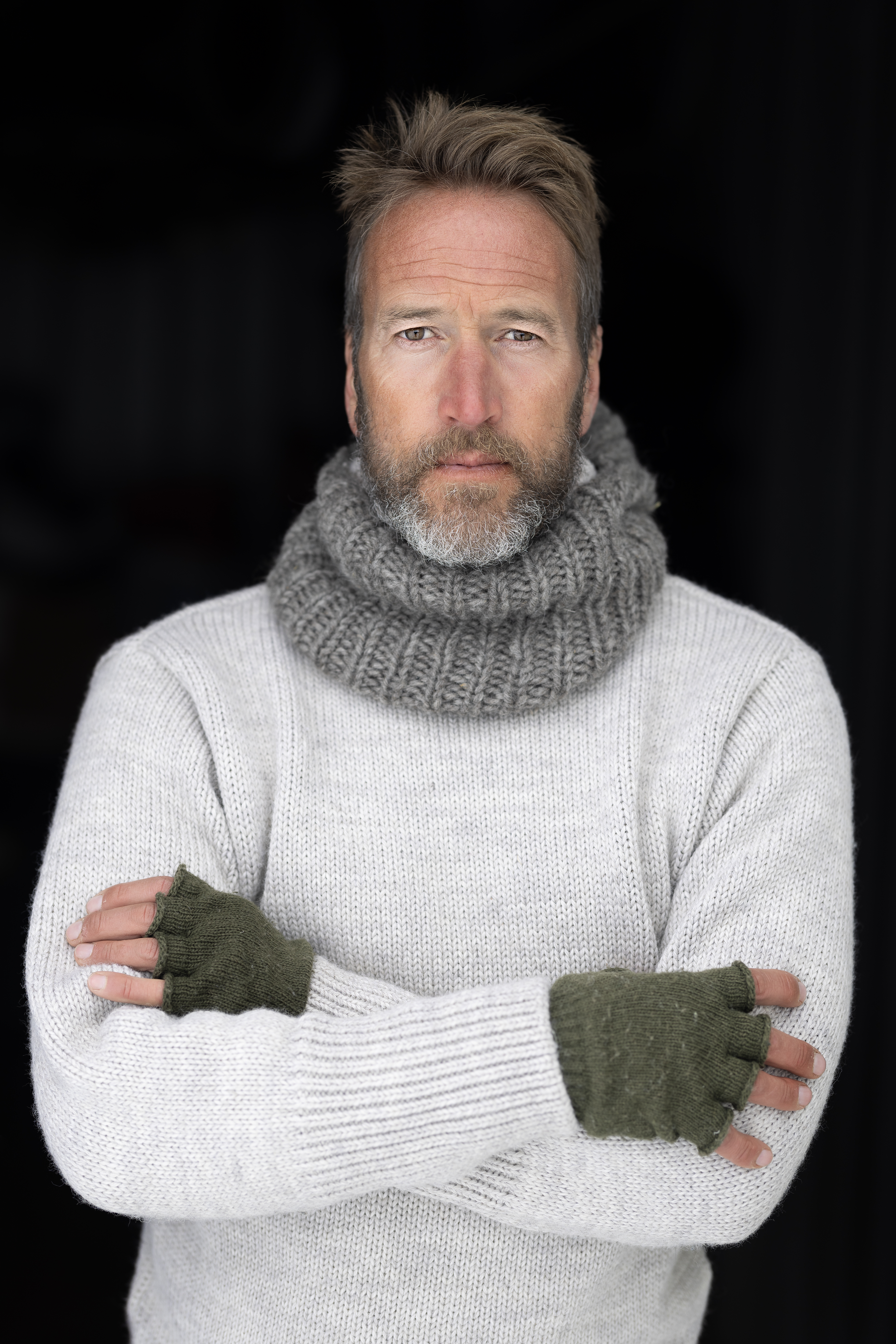
- Fogle in Antarctica (2023)
- Born: Benjamin Myer Fogle; 3 November 1973 (age 53); Westminster, London, England
- Education: University of Portsmouth; University of Costa Rica
- Occupations: Television presenter and writer
- Spouse: Marina Fogle (m. 2006)
- Children: Two
- Parent(s): Julia Foster; Bruce Fogle
- Website: www.benfogle.com

Benjamin Myer Fogle FRGS (born 3 November 1973) is an English broadcaster, writer and adventurer, best known for his presenting roles on programmes shown on British television channels Channel 5, BBC and ITV.

== Early life ==
Fogle is the son of English actress Julia Foster and Canadian veterinarian Bruce Fogle. He was educated at two independent schools: The Hall School, Hampstead, in London, and Bryanston School in Blandford Forum, Dorset. Fogle’s paternal grandfather, Morris Fogle, was the son of Eastern European Jews who migrated to Scotland to avoid persecution.

After completing his studies, Fogle took a gap year to Ecuador, working in an orphanage teaching English. He then took a second year working on a turtle conservation project on the Mosquito Coast of Honduras and Nicaragua.

Fogle undertook a degree in Latin American studies at the University of Portsmouth, graduating with lower second-class honours. He also studied for a year at the University of Costa Rica during his degree.

During this time, Fogle was a member of the University Royal Naval Unit (URNU). He became a Midshipman in the Royal Naval Reserve, serving as an officer on HMS Blazer and delivering aid to war-torn Bosnia and Croatia.

== Career ==
=== Magazines ===
Fogle's initial jobs included picture editor at Tatler magazine.

=== Television ===
Fogle first came to public notice when he participated in the BBC reality show Castaway 2000, which followed a group of thirty-six people marooned on the Scottish island of Taransay for a year, starting 1 January 2000. This was a social experiment aimed at creating a fully self-sufficient community within a year.

Fogle is a television presenter who has worked for the BBC, ITV, Channel 5, Sky, Discovery and the National Geographic channels in the UK. He has hosted Crufts, One Man and His Dog, Countryfile, Country Tracks, Extreme Dreams with Ben Fogle, Animal Park, Wild on the West Coast, Wild in Africa, "Ben Fogle – African Migration" and Ben Fogle's Escape in Time.

In 2010, Fogle made a film about the facial deforming disease noma for a BBC Two documentary Make Me A New Face which followed the work of the charity Facing Africa and Great Ormond Street Hospital.

Fogle has produced films about naval history and the Royal National Lifeboat Institution (RNLI) for the History Channel and followed Princes William and Harry on their first joint Royal Tour in Botswana and made an exclusive documentary called Prince William's Africa. He marked the centenary of Captain Scott's expedition to the South Pole with The Secrets of Scott's Hut. Fogle is popular on the motivational and corporate speaking circuit. His two-part documentary, Swimming with Crocodiles aired on BBC Two in 2012. Production commenced in 2011 for Storm City in 3D on Sky One and National Geographic. Fogle was hired for two years as a special correspondent for NBC News in the United States, in 2011. Their purpose was to cover the April royal wedding of Prince William and Catherine Middleton and the 2012 London Olympics.

Fogle appeared on the programme Countryfile with John Craven from 2001 to 2008, during which he reported on a number of UK rural pastimes. He rejoined the programme in 2014.

Since 2013, Fogle has presented two series of Harbour Lives, a documentary series on ITV. In 2014, Fogle joined the presenting team on ITV series Countrywise with Liz Bonnin and Paul Heiney, which covers aspects of the British coast and country.

Since 2013, Fogle has presented his show for Channel 5 called Ben Fogle: New Lives in the Wild, that sees him follow the stories of people living "off grid" in the wild and isolated from society. In 2024, he interviewed musician Vanessa Forero in her Colombian cabin about the kidnapping of her mother Marina Chapman, and has expressed his hope to make a film about Chapman's life story.

Fogle took over as the host of recommissioned and re-titled Ben Fogle's Animal Clinic on Channel 5, replacing disgraced presenter Rolf Harris.

In 2016, Ben Fogle also had an accidental appearance on the hit TV series Taskmaster during a task in which the contestants were completing a task on the river with giant foam hands, Dave Gorman asked Ben Fogle to yell from across the river.

In 2026, Fogle participated in the seventh series of The Masked Singer as "Sloth". He was unmasked in the seventh episode.

=== Sport ===
==== Atlantic Rowing Race ====
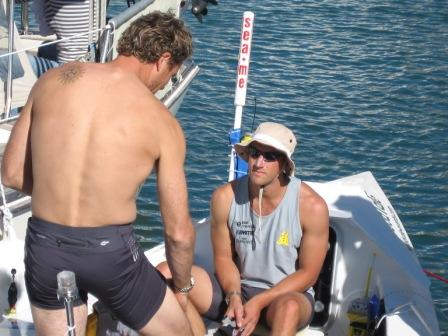
Fogle and Cracknell before the start of the 2005 Atlantic Rowing Race

Fogle was the first to cross the line in the pairs division of the 2005–2006 Atlantic Rowing Race in "Spirit of EDF Energy", partnered by Olympic rower James Cracknell. While competing in the 3,000-mile race, the pair had their boat fully capsized by huge waves. They made landfall in Antigua at 07.13 GMT on 19 January 2006, a crossing time of 49 days, 19 hours, 8 minutes. After penalties, they were placed second in the pairs and fourth overall. In 2007, the BBC series that followed the pair, Through Hell and High Water, won a Royal Television Society award.

==== Marathon des Sables ====
He has also completed the six-day Marathon des Sables for the World Wide Fund for Nature across 160 miles (260 km) of the Sahara Desert and the Safaricom Marathon in Kenya for the Tusk Trust, with Longleat Safari Park keeper Ryan Hockley. Fogle has completed the Bupa Great North Run in 1 hour 33 minutes, the London Marathon and the Royal Parks Half Marathon. He beat EastEnders actor Sid Owen in a three-round charity boxing match for BBC Sport Relief under the training of Frank Bruno and he recently re-ran the Safaricom marathon in Kenya with the injured Battleback Soldiers.

==== Amundsen Omega 3 South Pole Race ====
Fogle teamed up with Cracknell once again, together with Ed Coats, a Bristol-based doctor, as Team QinetiQ to take part in the inaugural "Amundsen Omega 3 South Pole Race". Six teams set out to race across the Antarctic Plateau to commemorate the historic race of 1911 between Roald Amundsen and Robert Falcon Scott. Having led the race for much of the time, the team took 18 days, 5 hours and 10 minutes to complete the 770-kilometre (480 mi) race, coming second overall, 20 hours behind the Norwegian team, who commended them on making it "a fantastic race", and over two days ahead of the next placed team. Fogle suffered hypothermia and frostbite to his nose and the team experienced temperatures as low as −40 °C (−40 °F). The race was filmed by the BBC for the series On Thin Ice and was aired in Summer 2009. Five episodes of On Thin Ice were broadcast on BBC Two Sunday evenings receiving a peak record of 3.7 million viewers. Macmillan published an account of their journey, Race to The Pole, which became a top-10 best-seller in the UK.

In October 2009, Fogle and Cracknell cycled a rickshaw 423 miles from Edinburgh to London non-stop. They took 60 hours to reach the capital, raising money for SSAFA (Soldiers, Sailors, Airmen and Families Association). The event was filmed as part of The Pride of Britain Awards. Fogle and Cracknell planned to take part in the Tour Divide race in 2010, a 3,000-mile mountain-bike race across the Rocky Mountains, from Banff in Canada to the border of Mexico. The world record is held by American Matthew Lee and stands at 17 days. The race was put on hold after Cracknell received life-threatening injuries after being knocked from his bicycle in America while training. In 2013, Fogle and Cracknell teamed up again for their third and final expedition across the Empty-quarter of Oman for a new BBC Two series.

==== Mount Everest ====
On 16 May 2018, Fogle summited Mount Everest, completing the climb over a six-week period whilst accompanied by two sherpa guides and Kenton Cool. His trek also included former Olympic cyclist Victoria Pendleton, who abandoned her attempt due to severe altitude sickness.

A film Our Mount Everest Challenge (The Challenge: Everest) documented by CNN, aired in June 2018, to highlight environmental issues around mountains in his new role as UN patron of the wilderness. The whole project was made possible by Fogle's good friend, Princess Haya Bint Al Hussein of Jordan, in memory of her father alongside raising awareness and money for The Red Cross.

=== Writing ===
Fogle has written ten books; The Teatime Islands (2004) in search of the remaining islands in the British Empire in which he travels to Saint Helena, Ascension Island, the Falkland Islands, the British Indian Ocean Territories and Tristan da Cunha. He also tried to visit Pitcairn Island by private yacht, but when the inhabitants learned that he was a journalist they refused to let him land. Fogle claims that they suspected that he was a spy, and after six hours of interrogation he was refused permission to visit and deported. He was also accused of attempting to smuggle a breadfruit on to the island. The book was short-listed for the WHSmith's people's award for Best Travel Book.

He has also written Offshore (2006), published by Penguin Books, in which he travelled around Britain in search of an island of his own. He visited the Principality of Sealand and attempted to land on Rockall in the North Atlantic. In 2006 he published The Crossing, published by Atlantic books and co-written with Cracknell followed their Transatlantic rowing bid. In 2009, The Race to the Pole was published by Macmillan and spent ten weeks in the best-seller list. His seventh book Labrador was released in 2015. In it, he explores the origin, characteristics and exploits of the breed.

In 2016, Land Rover: The Story of the Car that Conquered the World was published. English: A Story of Marmite, Queuing and Weather, which was published in 2017, examines the English national character. He published his tenth book, Up, in October 2018. Co-written with his wife, Marina, Up documents his planning, training and eventual summit of Mount Everest.

In 2019 Fogle launched a children's book series, co-written by best-selling children's author Steve Cole (author) and illustrated by Nikolas Ilic. Inspired by Fogle's real-life encounters with animals, the series follows the character of Mr Dog and his many sidekicks and friends. Between March 2019 and January 2020, four Mr Dog books were published, with two more billed for late 2020.

Fogle writes a weekly Country Diary for the Sunday Telegraph and is a regular columnist for The Daily Telegraph and travel writer for The Independent and has contributed to the Evening Standard, The New York Times, the Sunday Times and Glamour magazine. He has interviewed Gordon Brown and Prince William for the Mail on Sunday's LIVE magazine. He is guest director of Cheltenham Literary Festival and a regular at the Hay-on-Wye festival.

== Activism ==
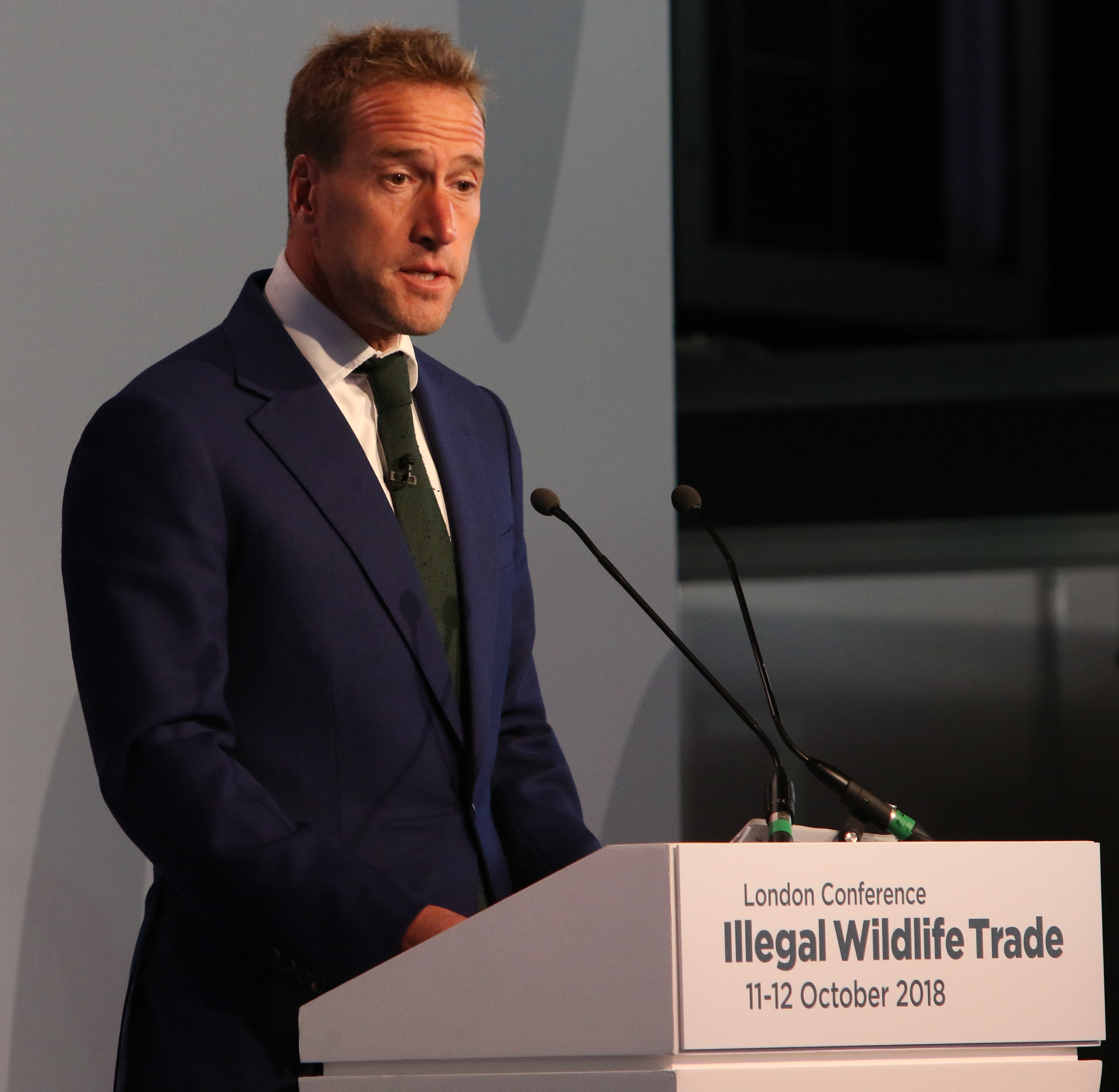
Fogle speaking at the Illegal Wildlife Trade Conference in London in 2018

Fogle is the UN Patron of the Wilderness, a role that sees him highlight the pressure and impact on the Earth's wildest corners. His aim is to focus more attention on the conservation cause and inspire greater global action to ensure our actions do not damage the environment.

He is the President of the Campaign for National Parks. Fogle is also: an ambassador for the World Wildlife Fund (WWF) and Tusk; a supporter of the Duke of Edinburgh award scheme, and Hearing Dogs for Deaf People. He is a fellow of the Royal Geographical Society. He is also a patron for the British Hedgehog Preservation Society, the Prince's Trust, the Royal Parks Foundation, Child Bereavement UK and ShelterBox.

Alongside the historian Philippa Gregory, Fogle is a patron of the UK Chagos Supporters Association, fighting for the islanders' rights to return to the British Indian Ocean Territory. He has described "the story of the Chagos islanders' treatment at the hands of the UK government" as "one for which I am ashamed to be British [...] a story of deceit [... which has] shaken my very principles on conservation and democracy."

In August 2014, Fogle was one of 200 public figures who were signatories to a letter to The Guardian expressing their hope that Scotland would vote to remain part of the United Kingdom in September's referendum on that issue.

On 11 May 2020 Fogle announced that his Twitter account would henceforth be donated to a different charity on a rolling, weekly basis. The first charity selected was WECare, a UK and Sri Lankan-registered veterinary charity. The repurposing of Fogle's Twitter account followed an incident of widespread trolling of Fogle following his suggestion of a nationwide sing-along to mark the 94th birthday of Queen Elizabeth II on Tuesday 21 April 2020.

== Filmography ==
Television

Year	Title	Role	Channel
2000–2001	Castaway 2000	Participant	BBC One
2001–2009, 2014–2015, 2017–2018	Countryfile	Co-presenter	BBC One
2001–2009, 2016–present	Animal Park	Co-presenter	BBC One/BBC Two
2002–2007	One Man and His Dog	Presenter	BBC Two
2003	Big Screen Britain	Presenter	BBC Two
2003	Death by Pets	Presenter	
2004	The Sand Marathon	Presenter	BBC Two
2005–2006	Animal Park: Wild in Africa	Co-presenter	BBC Two
2006	Through Hell and High Water	Co-presenter	BBC One
2006, 2007–2008	Crufts	Co-presenter	BBC Two
	Cash in the Attic	Co-presenter	BBC One
2007	Animal Park: Wild on the West Coast	Co-presenter	BBC Two
2007–2009	Extreme Dreams with Ben Fogle	Presenter	BBC Two
2009	On Thin Ice	Co-presenter	BBC Two
2009–2010	Country Tracks	Co-presenter	BBC One
2010	Ben Fogle's Escape in Time	Presenter	BBC Two
2010	Make Me A New Face: Hope For Africa's Hidden Children	Presenter	BBC Two
2010	Prince William's Africa	Presenter	Sky1
2011	The Secrets of Scott's Hut	Presenter	BBC Two
2011	The World's Most Dangerous Roads	Co-presenter	BBC Two
2012	Swimming with Crocodiles	Presenter	BBC Two
2012	Lonely Planet's Year of Adventures	Presenter	Travel Channel
2013—	Ben Fogle: New Lives in the Wild	Presenter	Channel 5
2013–2016	Countrywise	Co-presenter	ITV
2013	Ben Fogle's Animal Clinic	Presenter	Channel 5
2013–2014	Harbour Lives	Presenter	ITV
2014	Trawlermen's Lives	Presenter	ITV
2015	Ben Fogle: The Great African Migration	Presenter	Channel 5
2016	Coastal Walks with My Dog	Co-presenter	Channel 4
2016	Taskmaster	Cameo	Dave
2017, 2018	Walks with My Dog	Co-presenter	More4
2018	Britain's Favourite Dogs: Top 100	Co-presenter	ITV
2018	Our Everest Challenge	Presenter	ITV
2020, 2022	New Lives in the Country (previously known as Ben Fogle: Make A New Life In The Country)	Presenter	Channel 5
2020–2021	For The Love Of Britain	Co-presenter	ITV
2021	Inside Chernobyl with Ben Fogle	Presenter	Channel 5
2021, 2023	Scotland’s Sacred Islands With Ben Fogle	Presenter	BBC One
2022	Falklands War: The Forgotten Battle	Presenter	ITV
2022	Ben Fogle & the Lost City	Presenter	Channel 5
2022	Lost Worlds with Ben Fogle	Presenter	Channel 5
2023	Ben Fogle and the Buried City	Presenter	Channel 5
2023	Endurance: Race to the Pole	Himself	Channel 5
2024	Into the Congo with Ben Fogle	Himself	Channel 5
2025	Expedition: Search For The Nile	Himself	Channel 5
2026	China with Ben Fogle	Himself	Channel 5
2026	Ben Fogle: Made in Sheffield	Himself	Channel 5

== Personal life ==
In 2006, Fogle married Marina Hunt. Their first child, a boy named Ludovic Herbert Richard Fogle, was born in 2009. Their second child, a girl named Iona, was born in 2011. In 2014, they had a stillborn son, Willem; Marina also nearly died after suffering an acute placental abruption at 33 weeks.

While filming a series of Extreme Dreams in Peru in 2008, Fogle contracted leishmaniasis, which left him bedridden for three weeks on his return home. He was treated at London's Hospital for Tropical Diseases. Fogle went on to make a documentary, Make Me a New Face, about children in Ethiopia suffering from flesh-eating bacteria called noma. The documentary was broadcast on BBC Two in 2010.

Fogle has had an acting cameo on the television programme Hotel Babylon.

On 20 February 2013, BBC Newsbeat published an article stating that he had claimed that his drink had been spiked at a pub in Gloucestershire. He described the effects as making him try to jump out of a window, and he subsequently spent a night in hospital.

In 2023 Fogle suffered what he described as a "complete breakdown", suffering from "nausea, crippling anxiety and paranoia" from which he later recovered.

== Honours ==
Fogle was awarded an honorary Doctor of Letters (DLitt) degree by the University of Portsmouth in 2007.

In 2010, Madame Tussauds modelled him as a waxwork. He was awarded the Freedom of the City of London in 2013.

== See also ==
- List of English writers
- List of television presenters
- Old Bryanstonians
