= Hearing Link =

UK-wide charitable organisation

Hearing Link, part of Hearing Dogs for Deaf People
- Type: Charitable organization
- Purpose: To ensure that people living with hearing loss can find information, specialist services, and social contact, in order to live well with hearing loss.
- Location: Saunderton, Buckinghamshire, United Kingdom
- Region served: UK
- Services: Helpdesk, support groups, 1 to 1 volunteer support
- Key people: Tracy Griffin (Chief Executive)
- Website: www.hearinglink.org
- Formerly called: The British Association of the Hard of Hearing (BAHOH) and the LINK Centre for Deafened People

Hearing Link Services is part of Hearing Dogs for Deaf People, a UK-wide charitable organisation for adults with hearing loss, their family and friends. The head office is in Saunderton, Buckinghamshire. Its Royal Patron is The Princess Royal.

== Activities ==
Hearing Link Services promotes and encourages peer support, so services are largely driven and delivered by people with personal experience of hearing loss:

- Create links with and between adults who have acquired hearing loss.
- Provide impartial advice and information including through the Helpdesk, website, events and programmes.
- Deliver specialist group programmes for adults with hearing loss and their families,.
- Provide advocacy for individuals and groups.
- Reflect and champion the views and priorities of people with hearing loss. For example, informing NHS England, Department of Health, Public Health England and Clinical Commissioning Groups how to better support those with hearing loss. Calling upon the Government to introduce a national hearing screening programme for everyone aged 65. Setting up a campaign in 2013 which aims to improve hearing loops in public buildings.
- Facilitate contact between people with hearing loss and appropriate service providers. For example, giving them information about hearing aid services so they can make the right decisions.
- Build and maintain a network of informed volunteers, professionals, and relevant bodies.
- Commission research studies designed to enhance the quality of life of people with hearing loss.

== Hearing Link history ==
Hearing Link was formed in 2008 through the merger of two national organisations: Hearing Concern and the LINK Centre for Deafened People.

Hearing Concern was originally called BAHOH – The British Association of the Hard of Hearing. It was renamed in the 1990s. It grew out of a number of informal gatherings that sprang up after the First World War when soldiers returned home deafened by gunfire. Over the years it did a huge amount of work, all focused on promoting the need for more and better support to be available for hard of hearing adults. This includes encouraging hard of hearing groups to be established and pushing for subtitles on TV and deaf awareness at government level.

The LINK Centre for Deafened People, meanwhile, was set up in 1972 and focused on developing and delivering unique and specialised rehabilitation programmes for profoundly deafened adults and their families. The approach was holistic and involved the wider health and circumstances of the individual, including their family.

For a short period after the merger the organisation was called Hearing Concern LINK. In January 2011, the organisation re-launched as Hearing Link.

In August 2017, Hearing Link merged with Hearing Dogs for Deaf People, another leading hearing loss charity.

In 2022, Hearing Link evolved and rebranded as Hearing Link Services.
