= Vanessa Forero =

English-Colombian composer

Vanessa Forero (born Vanessa Chapman and sometimes performing as Vanessa James), is an English-Colombian singer-songwriter and author who has written film and television scores. She plays the keyboard and has performed with various groups, including the orchestral rock band Starling.

Forero is the daughter of Marina Chapman, an ethnic Colombian woman best known for her story of being raised by monkeys in the jungle in the 1950s.

== Career ==
Forero spent two years researching and writing her mother's memoir, with author Lynne Barrett-Lee, which was published in 2013 as The Girl With No Name. Forero and her mother both appeared on BBC Breakfast Time.

In January 2024, Forero appeared on the feature length first episode of the new documentary adventure series, Ben Fogle: New Lives in the Wild on Channel 5 that was first broadcast in the United Kingdom.

== Personal life ==
Forero is the youngest daughter of Marina Chapman, an ethnic Colombian woman best known for her story of being raised by monkeys in the jungle in the 1950s.

Forero grew up and attended a Pentecostal Protestant Church in England, with her family, and was very involved in the church's music services and programs- even touring the world as part of the denomination's Contemporary Christian Music Missions band for a time. At age 19, Forero married a pastor's son and music producer. They separated 15 years later.

As of 2024, Forero resides in a round cabin that she built and created for herself in the middle of a jaguar reserve in Sierra Nevada de Santa Marta. Forero has installed a home recording studio with electricity and Wi-Fi access. Her studio is home to an extensive collection of musical instruments, which she uses to record and produce her own indie-folk recordings. Her debut EP was From The Uproar.

== Discography ==
=== Solo ===
- From the Uproar (2016)
- Same Boat (2016)
- La Catrina (2019)
- Pablo Escobar (2019)
- Fuego (2020)
- No One's Singing Today (2021)
- Aluna (2023)

=== With Starling ===
- Dream Again (2014) as part of her touring band Starling
