= Bledlow-cum-Saunderton =

Civil parish in Buckinghamshire, England

Coordinates: 51.7137°N 0.8760°W

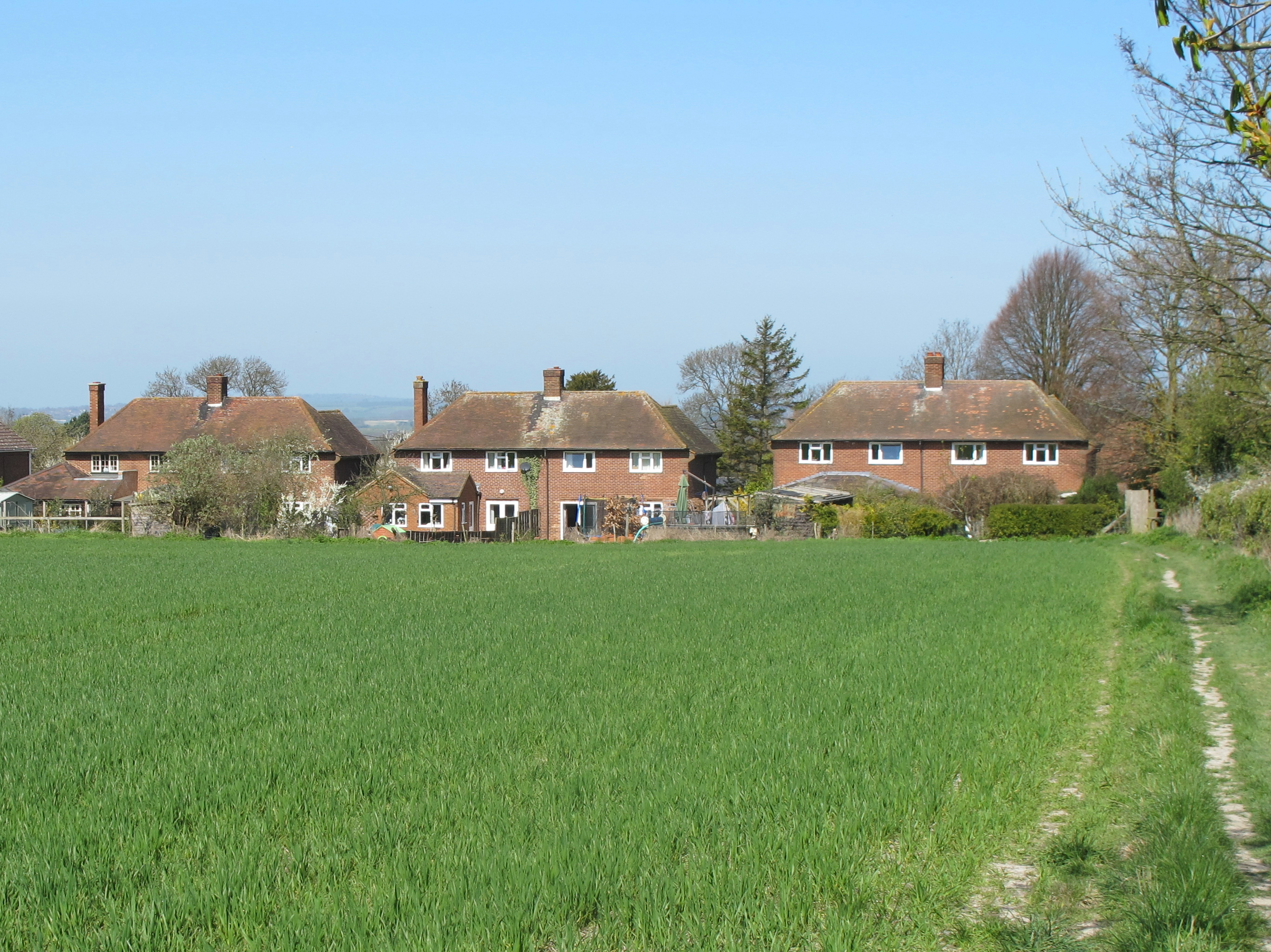
- Winter wheat and houses at Bledlow, 2010

- Location within Buckinghamshire
- Population: 2,249 (census 2001); 2,469 (census 2011)
- OS grid reference: SP780026
- Unitary authority: Buckinghamshire
- Ceremonial county: Buckinghamshire
- Region: South East
- Country: England
- Sovereign state: United Kingdom
- Post town: Princes Risborough
- Postcode district: HP27
- Post town: High Wycombe
- Postcode district: HP14
- Dialling code: 01844, 01494
- Police: Thames Valley
- Fire: Buckinghamshire
- Ambulance: South Central
- UK Parliament: Mid Buckinghamshire constituency,
- Website: Parish Council

Bledlow-cum-Saunderton is a civil parish in Buckinghamshire, England. It contains the villages of Bledlow, Bledlow Ridge and Saunderton and the hamlets of Crownfield, Forty Green, Holly Green, Pitch Green, Rout's Green, Saunderton Lee and Skittle Green. It had a population of 2,469 according to the 2011 census. From 1974 to 2020 it was in Wycombe district, in 2020 it became part of Buckinghamshire district.
