= Extreme Dreams with Ben Fogle =

British television series

Extreme Dreams is a reality TV programme made by the independent British production company Ricochet (creators of Supernanny, Living in the Sun and other series) and hosted by Ben Fogle. The premise behind the show is that deserving individuals are taken to unfamiliar and extreme environments and given the opportunity to participate in an adventure beyond their wildest dreams.

Participants are typically seeking a life-changing experience: a boost to improve their health, build their confidence, mend relationships or overcome past difficulties. For each programme four different teams are selected by a small panel comprising adventurers and a psychologist as well as Ben Fogle himself. Each team then travels with Ben to a different region of the world to undertake a challenging trek.

== First series (2006) ==
Extreme Dreams aired on BBC2 at 6.30 p.m. from 18 September 2006.

Teams were chosen to travel to:

- Peru (episodes 1–5), to complete a trekking expedition to Choquequirao
- Guyana (episodes 6–10), to trek through the jungle to the Kaieteur Falls
- Tanzania (episodes 11–15), to climb Mount Kilimanjaro (5,895m), the highest peak in Africa
- Spitsbergen (episodes 16–20), a Norwegian island in the Arctic Ocean, to trek across glaciers to Temple Mountain

The Guyana trip was organised for Ricochet by Trekforce, an expedition company that was able to assist with planning, logistics and safety before and during the trek. The brief was for "a jungle destination that was remote, rarely visited and difficult to get to" but allowed the camera crews and production team to go about their everyday duties and did not compromise on safety issues.

== Second series (2008) ==
Series Two aired on BBC2 at 6.30 p.m. from 14 January 2008. The teams of five participants for the second series were chosen by Ben Fogle in February 2007 in Wales, with input from explorer Benedict Allen, wildlife presenter Charlotte Uhlenbroek and psychologist Dr Cynthia McVey. The teams travelled to, respectively:

- Nepal, to trek to the sacred lakes of Panch Pokhari in Langtang National Park (one participant evacuated, four successful)
- Uganda, to climb the 4844m Mount Baker (two evacuated, three successful)
- Libya, to cross a section of the Sahara and reach the ancient city of Ghat (one denied a visa, one evacuated, three successful)
- Papua New Guinea, to cross the jungle to Salamoa Beach in Morobe Province on the east coast (all five successful)

Subsequently, one member of each team was chosen to join Ben in pursuit of his own extreme dream, an ascent of Mount Roraima in Venezuela, location of Arthur Conan Doyle's 1912 adventure novel The Lost World which Ben cites as a childhood favourite. All four participants made it to the summit with Ben.

== Third series (2009) ==
Fogle and his teams completed these expeditions in 2008, and Series Three aired on BBC2 at 6.30 p.m. from 12 January 2009.

- Ecuador, to the volcanic Chimborazo (none successful, one evacuated)
- Peru, to the Petroglyphs of Pusharo (four successful, one evacuated)
- Peru, to the Cotahuasi Canyon in search of the Incan city of Marpa
- Chile, across the Atacama Desert to Volcano Corona

== Criticism ==
Extreme Dreams has received criticism in online forums for the apparently heightened drama of sometimes minor challenges, where everything that happens has to be perceived as "extreme". Critics have suggested that excessively dramatic presenting and selective editing are used to overemphasise the level of danger and difficulty. Evidence cited includes fictitious sandstorms where the adventurers' clothing is not blowing in the wind; fears of death being imminent and evacuation impossible when the footage is clearly filmed from a moving vehicle; a trek down a hillside on a clearly defined path, described as a dangerous trek through uncharted territory; small tumbles on the trail recalled as nearly fatal; and a misleading depiction of the level of isolation of the group. An episode in the third series claimed that a participant had run a marathon with a foot fracture that had not healed.

Conversely, the programme has also attracted criticism for apparently placing fragile or unfit individuals in real danger. Trekforce indicates on its website that the teams were safe and well at all times during the Guyana and Papua New Guinea expeditions. In a similar vein EWP clearly state the Libya Sahara trek involved a standard tourist programme although an abseil down a cliff was thrown in for extra drama.

== DVD ==
Series one of the show has been released on DVD by Acorn Media UK.
