= Ben Fogle: New Lives in the Wild =

Television series

- Starring: Ben Fogle
- Narrated by: Ben Fogle
- Country of origin: United Kingdom
- Original language: English
- No. of series: 21
- No. of episodes: 134

Production
- Running time: 45 minutes
- Production companies: Renegade Pictures (seasons 1–16); Ricochet (season 17–); Motion Content Group

Original release
- Network: Channel 5 (UK)
- Release: 22 April 2013 – present

Ben Fogle: New Lives in the Wild is a television series on Channel 5 hosted by English adventurer Ben Fogle and produced by Motion Content Group and Renegade Pictures. The programme shows, in a series of unconnected episodes, Fogle meeting people who have adopted 'alternative' lifestyles that are primarily 'off-the-grid' in some of the more remote locations on Earth.

Fogle hosted a spin-off series in 2015 called New Lives in the Wild UK with families in British locations, while 2020's Ben Fogle: Make a New Life in the Country is of a similar premise. As of 2022, the UK-based programmes and Return to the Wild spin-offs have been brought under the main New Lives in the Wild name in the press, on EPGs and video-on-demand service My5, with these episodes not being part of a separate series. Episodes have been hosted on BBC Earth under the name Where Wild Men Are with Ben Fogle.

== Premise ==
The series follows adventurer Fogle as he meets people who have given up the rat race to live a simpler life in remote corners of the world, often without modern amenities. In each episode, Fogle immerses himself in their lives to explore their motivations and highs and lows, whilst living in tough and harsh conditions in the wild.

== Series overview ==
Series	Episodes	Originally released	
Series	Episodes	First released	Last released
1	4	22 April 2013	13 May 2013
2	4	31 January 2014	21 February 2014
3	4	21 November 2014	12 December 2014
4	5	20 July 2015	17 August 2015
5	8	25 October 2016	13 December 2016
6	8	17 October 2017	5 December 2017
7	4	25 September 2018	16 October 2018
8	4	8 January 2019	29 January 2019
9	4	19 April 2019	29 May 2019
10	3	29 October 2019	12 November 2019
11	5	7 January 2020	4 February 2020
12	6	26 May 2020	30 June 2020
13	5	5 January 2021	9 February 2021
14	6	16 February 2021	23 March 2021
15	4	30 March 2021	21 September 2021
16	11	4 January 2022	29 March 2022
17	12	3 January 2023	4 April 2023
18	11	2 January 2024	4 April 2024
19	10	7 January 2025	9 April 2024
20	3	14 August 2025	4 September 2025
21	10	15 January 2026	3 November 2026

== Episodes ==
=== Series 1 (2013) ===
No. overall	No. in series	Title	Location	Directed by	Series Producer	Original release date
1	1	"Australia"	Restoration Island, Queensland, Australia	Elliot Kew	Natalie Wilkinson	22 April 2013
2	2	"Alaska,"	Seldovia, Alaska, US	Elliot Kew	Natalie Wilkinson	29 April 2013
3	3	"New Zealand"	Haast, South Island, New Zealand	Elliot Kew	Natalie Wilkinson	6 May 2013
4	4	"Texas, USA"	Terlingua, Texas, United States	Elliot Kew	Natalie Wilkinson	13 May 2013

=== Series 2 (2014) ===
No. overall	No. in series	Title	Location	Directed by	Series Producer	Original release date
5	1	"Georgia Swamplands, USA"	Georgia, United States	Livia Simoka	Natalie Wilkinson	31 January 2014
6	2	"Himalayan Foothills, India"	Uttarakhand, India	Livia Simoka	Natalie Wilkinson	7 February 2014
7	3	"Leyte, Philippines"	Pancil, Leyte, Philippines	Livia Simoka	Natalie Wilkinson	14 February 2014
8	4	"Panama"	Bocas Del Toro, Panama	Livia Simoka	Natalie Wilkinson	21 February 2014

=== Series 3 (2014) ===
No. overall	No. in series	Title	Location	Directed by	Series Producer	Original release date
9	1	"Namibia"	Namib Desert, Namibia	Sean McDonnell	Natalie Wilkinson	21 November 2014
10	2	"Alaska"	Alaskan Interior, Alaska, United States	Sean McDonnell	Natalie Wilkinson	28 November 2014
11	3	"Utah, USA"	Canyonlands National Park, Utah, United States	Sean McDonnell	Natalie Wilkinson	5 December 2014
12	4	"Swedish Arctic Circle"	Kurravaara, Arctic Circle, Sweden	Sean McDonnell	Natalie Wilkinson	12 December 2014

=== Series 4 (2015) ===
No. overall	No. in series	Title	Location	Directed by	Series Producer	Original release date
13	1	"Laos"	Don Det Island, Champasak Province, Laos	Sean McDonnell	Natalie Wilkinson	20 July 2015
14	2	"Kimberley Region, Australia"	Kimberley, WA, Australia	Sean McDonnell	Natalie Wilkinson	27 July 2015
15	3	"Appalachian Mountains, USA"	Appalachian Mountains, Tennessee, United States	Sean McDonnell	Natalie Wilkinson	3 August 2015
16	4	"French Polynesia"	Nuku Hiva, French Polynesia	Sean McDonnell	Natalie Wilkinson	10 August 2015
17	5	"Scotland"	Rùm, Scotland	Sean McDonnell	Natalie Wilkinson	17 August 2015

=== Series 5 (2016) ===
No. overall	No. in series	Title	Location	Directed by	Series Producer	Original release date
18	1	"North Cascades, USA"	North Cascades, Washington State, United States	Claire Bugden	Natalie Wilkinson	25 October 2016
19	2	"Tanzania"	Ruaha National Park, Tanzania	Claire Bugden	Natalie Wilkinson	1 November 2016
20	3	"Hungary"	Gadács, Hungary	Claire Bugden	Natalie Wilkinson	8 November 2016
21	4	"British Columbia, Canada"	Selkirk Mountains, British Columbia, Canada	Claire Bugden	Natalie Wilkinson	15 November 2016
22	5	"Ibiza"	Ibiza, Spain	Claire Bugden	Natalie Wilkinson	22 November 2016
23	6	"Outer Mongolia"	Khatgal, Outer Mongolia	Claire Bugden	Natalie Wilkinson	29 November 2016
24	7	"Appalachian Mountains, USA"	Pisgah Forest, North Carolina, United States	Claire Bugden	Natalie Wilkinson	6 December 2016
25	8	"Morocco"	Atlas Mountains, Morocco	Claire Bugden	Natalie Wilkinson	13 December 2016

=== Series 6 (2017) ===
No. overall	No. in series	Title	Location	Directed by	Series Producer	Original release date
26	1	"Wilderness Island, Australia"	Exmouth, WA, Australia	Sean McDonnell	Natalie Wilkinson	17 October 2017
27	2	"Freedom Cove, Canada"	Tofino, Vancouver Island, Canada	Sean McDonnell	Natalie Wilkinson	24 October 2017
28	3	"Sahara Desert, North Africa"	Edge of the Sahara Desert, Egypt	Sean McDonnell	Natalie Wilkinson	31 October 2017
29	4	"Great Barrier Island, New Zealand"	Great Barrier Island, New Zealand	Sean McDonnell	Natalie Wilkinson	7 November 2017
30	5	"Andalucia, Spain"	Montoro, Andalucia, Spain	Sean McDonnell	Natalie Wilkinson	14 November 2017
31	6	"Guatemala"	Lanquin, Guatemala	Sean McDonnell	Natalie Wilkinson	21 November 2017
32	7	"Missouri, USA"	Ozark Plateau, Missouri, United States	Sean McDonnell	Natalie Wilkinson	28 November 2017
33	8	"Cambodia"	Koh Ach Seh, Cambodia	Kate Fraser	Natalie Wilkinson	5 December 2017

=== Ben Fogle: Return to the Wild (2018) ===
Title	Location	Directed by	Series Producer	Original release date
"Restoration Island, Australia"	Restoration Island, Queensland, Australia	Sean McDonnell	Natalie Wilkinson	17 December 2017
"Canyonlands National Park, Utah"	Canyonlands National Park, Utah, United States	Sean McDonnell	Natalie Wilkinson	6 February 2018
"Hungary"	Gadács, Hungary	Sean McDonnell	Natalie Wilkinson	13 February 2018
"Texas"	Terlingua, Texas, United States	Sean McDonnell	Natalie Wilkinson	20 February 2018
"India"	Uttarakhand, India	Sean McDonnell	Natalie Wilkinson	27 February 2018

=== Series 7 (2018) ===
No. overall	No. in series	Title	Location	Directed by	Series Producer	Original release date
34	1	"Arkansas, USA"	Winslow, Arkansas, United States	Dimitri Collingridge	Natalie Wilkinson	25 September 2018
35	2	"New Zealand"	Kawhia, North Island, New Zealand	Dimitri Collingridge	Natalie Wilkinson	2 October 2018
36	3	"Thailand"	Mae Hong Son, Thailand	Dimitri Collingridge	Natalie Wilkinson	9 October 2018
37	4	"Norway"	Nordskot, Steigen, Norway	Dimitri Collingridge	Natalie Wilkinson	16 October 2018

=== Series 8 (2019) ===
No. overall	No. in series	Title	Location	Directed by	Series Producer	Original release date
38	1	"Bulgaria"	Rhodope Mountains, Bulgaria	Jo Young	Natalie Wilkinson	8 January 2019
39	2	"Canada"	British Columbia, Canada	Jo Young	Natalie Wilkinson	15 January 2019
40	3	"Ireland"	Slieve League, County Donegal, Ireland	Jo Young	Natalie Wilkinson	22 January 2019
41	4	"Brazil"	Novo Airão, Brazil	Jo Young	Natalie Wilkinson	29 January 2019

=== Series 9 (2019) ===
No. overall	No. in series	Title	Location	Directed by	Series Producer	Original release date
42	1	"Peru"	Paracas, Peru	Gary Johnstone	Sean McDonnell	16 April 2019
43	2	"Morocco"	Atlas Mountains, Morocco	Gary Johnstone	Sean McDonnell	23 April 2019
44	3	"Panama"	Boquete, Panama	Gary Johnstone	Sean McDonnell	30 April 2019
45	4	"Sri Lanka"	Talalla, Sri Lanka	Gary Johnstone	Sean McDonnell	7 May 2019

=== Series 10 (2019) ===
No. overall	No. in series	Title	Location	Directed by	Series Producer	Original release date
46	1	"Sweden"	Southern Sweden	Sean McDonnell	Natalie Wilkinson	29 October 2019
47	2	"Ethiopia"	Lalibela, Ethiopia	Sean McDonnell	Natalie Wilkinson	5 November 2019
48	3	"Panama"	Bocas del Toro, Panama	Sean McDonnell	Natalie Wilkinson	12 November 2019

=== Series 11 (2020) ===
No. overall	No. in series	Title	Location	Directed by	Series Producer	Original release date
49	1	"Iceland"	Western Iceland	Sean McDonnell	Natalie Wilkinson	7 January 2020
50	2	"Siberia"	Northeastern Siberia, Russia	Sean McDonnell	Natalie Wilkinson	14 January 2020
51	3	"New Zealand"	Karangahake Gorge, North Island, New Zealand	Sean McDonnell	Natalie Wilkinson	21 January 2020
52	4	"Croatia"	Papuk, Croatia	Alex Brisland	Natalie Wilkinson	28 January 2020
53	5	"Oregon"	Wallowa Mountains, North eastern Oregon, United States	Sean McDonnell	Natalie Wilkinson	4 February 2020

=== Series 12: Ben Fogle: Return to the Wild (2020) ===
No. overall	No. in series	Title	Location	Directed by	Series Producer	Original release date
54	1	"Gorge River, New Zealand"	Gorge River, New Zealand	Livia Simoka	Natalie Wilkinson	26 May 2020
55	2	"Georgia, USA"	Swamplands of southern Georgia, United States	Livia Simoka	Natalie Wilkinson	2 June 2020
56	3	"Wilderness Island Australia"	Exmouth, WA, Australia	Livia Simoka	Natalie Wilkinson	9 June 2020
57	4	"Arkansas, USA"	Winslow, Arkansas, United States	Livia Simoka	Natalie Wilkinson	16 June 2020
58	5	"Fiji, Pacific Ocean"	Nuku Hiva, French Polynesia	Livia Simoka	Natalie Wilkinson	23 June 2020
59	6	"British Columbia, Canada"	Meadow Creek, BC, Canada	Livia Simoka	Natalie Wilkinson	30 June 2020

=== Series 13 (2021) ===
No. overall	No. in series	Title	Location	Directed by	Series Producer	Original release date
60	1	"Wales Mountainside: The Watkins Family"	Pembrokeshire, Wales	Livia Simoka	Natalie Wilkinson	5 January 2021
61	2	"Iceland"	Fljótsdalsvegur, Iceland	Livia Simoka	Natalie Wilkinson	12 January 2021
62	3	"Northern Ireland"	Rathlin Island, Northern Ireland	Livia Simoka	Natalie Wilkinson	19 January 2021
63	4	"Scotland"	Western Isles, Scotland	Livia Simoka	Natalie Wilkinson	26 January 2021
64	5	"Ireland"	Galway, Ireland	Livia Simoka	Natalie Wilkinson	9 February 2021

=== Series 14: Ben Fogle: Return to the Wild (2021) ===
No. overall	No. in series	Title	Location	Directed by	Series Producer	Original release date
65	1	"The Owen Family"	Ravenseat Farm, Yorkshire Dales, England (Note: This episode was an update to a November 2015 visit undertaken by Fogle as part of the spin-off series New Lives in the Wild UK and featured new footage of Amanda, Clive and the Owen children: Raven, Edith, Sidney, Miles, Reuben, Clementine, Nancy, Annas and Violet from Channel 5's Our Yorkshire Farm)	Kate Fraser	Amy Hounsell	16 February 2021
66	2	"Wales"	Welsh woodland, Wales	Kate Fraser	Amy Hounsell	23 February 2021
67	3	"Devon"	Devon countryside, England	Kate Fraser	Amy Hounsell	2 March 2021
68	4	"Fair Isle"	Shetland island, Scotland	Kate Fraser	Amy Hounsell	9 March 2021
69	5	"Exmoor"	Exmoor National Park, Devon, England	Kate Fraser	Amy Hounsell	16 March 2021
70	6	"Scotland"	Rùm, Small Isles, Inner Hebrides, Scotland	Kate Fraser	Amy Hounsell	23 March 2021

=== Series 15 (2021) ===
No. overall	No. in series	Title	Location	Directed by	Series Producer	Original release date
71	1	"Ullapool"	Ullapool, Scottish Highlands, Scotland	Jo Young	Natalie Wilkinson	30 March 2021
72	2	"Wales"	Black Mountains, Wales	Jo Young	Natalie Wilkinson	7 September 2021
73	3	"Suffolk"	Suffolk, England	Jo Young	Natalie Wilkinson	14 September 2021
74	4	"Scottish Hebrides"	Erraid, Inner Hebrides, Scotland	Gareth Prescott	Natalie Wilkinson	21 September 2021

=== Series 16 (2022) ===
No. overall	No. in series	Title	Location	Directed by	Series Producer	Original release date
75	1	"Portugal"	Castelo Branco, Portugal	Natalie Wilkinson	Alexis Anoyrkatis	4 January 2022
76	2	"Ireland"	County Mayo, Ireland	Natalie Wilkinson	Alexis Anoyrkatis	11 January 2022
77	3	"Greek island of Andros"	Andros, Greece	Natalie Wilkinson	Alexis Anoyrkatis	18 January 2022
78	4	"Cornwall"	Perranporth, Cornwall, England	Natalie Wilkinson	Alexis Anoyrkatis	25 January 2022
79	5	"Shetlands"	Yell, Shetland Islands, Scotland	Natalie Wilkinson	Alexis Anoyrkatis	8 February 2022
80	6	"Northumberland"	Northumberland, England	Natalie Wilkinson	Alexis Anoyrkatis	15 February 2022
81	7	"Oxfordshire"	Oxfordshire, England	Natalie Wilkinson	Alexis Anoyrkatis	22 February 2022
82	8	"Arizona Desert"	Arizona, United States	Natalie Wilkinson	Alexis Anoyrkatis	8 March 2022
83	9	"Norway: Lynx (Note: This episode is one of the Ben Fogle: Return to the Wild shows and is actually branded on-screen with this title, though rather than appearing as a spin-off programme in the press and on EPGs, Channel 5 decided to schedule it as part of their regular New Lives in the Wild programmes.)"	Norway	Natalie Wilkinson	Alexis Anoyrkatis	15 March 2022
84	10	"Morocco: Karen"	Tissardmine, Morocco	Natalie Wilkinson	Alexis Anoyrkatis	22 March 2022
85	11	"Wales: The Watkinsons"	Pembrokeshire, Wales	Natalie Wilkinson	Alexis Anoyrkatis	29 March 2022

=== Series 17 (2023) ===
No. overall	No. in series	Title	Location	Directed by	Series Producer	Original release date
86	1	"Sierra Nevada"	Sierra Nevada, California, United States	Gareth Prescott	Natalie Wilkinson	3 January 2023
87	2	"Queensland"	Queensland, Australia	Gareth Prescott	Natalie Wilkinson	10 January 2023
88	3	"California Desert: DNA (Note: This episode features gender-fluid artist DNA, who also appeared in the April 2022 documentary Ben Fogle & The Lost City.)"	Slab City, California, United States	Gareth Prescott	Natalie Wilkinson	17 January 2023
89	4	"Uruguay - Rhona Mitra"	Uruguay	Gareth Prescott	Natalie Wilkinson	24 January 2023
90	5	"Tuscany"	Casentinesi Forest National Park, Tuscany, Italy	Gareth Prescott	Natalie Wilkinson	31 January 2023
91	6	"Oregon River (Note: This episode features "Pirate" Rob, who also appeared in the April 2022 documentary Ben Fogle & The Lost City.)"	Oregon, United States	Gareth Prescott	Natalie Wilkinson	7 February 2023
92	7	"Zambia"	Kafue National Park, Zambia	Gareth Prescott	Natalie Wilkinson	14 February 2023
93	8	"The Azores"	Azores, Portugal	Gareth Prescott	Natalie Wilkinson	7 March 2023
94	9	"Dorset"	Dorset, England	Gareth Prescott	Natalie Wilkinson	14 March 2023
95	10	"Australia Revisit"	Kununurra, Western Australia, Australia	Gareth Prescott	Natalie Wilkinson	21 March 2023
96	11	"Sweden Revisit"	Sweden	Gareth Prescott	Natalie Wilkinson	28 March 2023
97	12	"Bulgaria Revisit"	Rhodope Mountains, Bulgaria	Gareth Prescott	Natalie Wilkinson	4 April 2023

=== Series 18 (2024) ===
No. overall	No. in series	Title	Location	Directed by	Series Producer	Original release date
98	1	"Colombia"	Minca, Colombia	Dimitri Collingridge	Natalie Wilkinson	2 January 2024
99	2	"Great Blasket Island"	Great Blasket Island, Ireland	Dimitri Collingridge	Natalie Wilkinson	9 January 2024
100	3	"Norway"	Northern Norway	Dimitri Collingridge	Natalie Wilkinson	16 January 2024
101	4	"Thailand"	Ko Samui, Thailand	Dimitri Collingridge	Natalie Wilkinson	23 January 2024
102	5	"Lincolnshire"	Lincolnshire	Sam Lang	Natalie Wilkinson	30 January 2024
103	6	"Sri Lanka"	Haputale, Sri Lanka	Sean McDonnel	Natalie Wilkinson	6 February 2024
104	7	"Portugal"	Castelo Branco, Portugal	Ita Fitzgerald	Natalie Wilkinson	13 February 2024
105	8	"Chile"	Chile	Jo Young	Natalie Wilkinson	27 February 2024
106	9	"Paul Ferber Revisited"	Koh Ach Seh, Cambodia/Thailand	Kate Fraser; Jo Young	Natalie Wilkinson	5 March 2024
107	10	"Revisit: Norway"	Northern Norway	Claire Bugden; Dimitri Collingridge	Natalie Wilkinson	26 March 2024
108	11	"Revisit: Sri Lanka"	Talalla, Sri Lanka	Sean McDonnell	Alexis Anoyrkatis	2 April 2024

=== Ben Fogle: Return to the Wild (2024) ===
No. overall	No. in series	Title	Location	Directed by	Series Producer	Original release date
109	1	"Revisit: Queensland"	Queensland, Australia	Sean McDonnell	Sean McDonnell	15 October 2024
110	2	"Revisit: Portugal"	Castelo Branco, Portugal	Sean McDonnell	Sean McDonnell	22 October 2024
111	3	"Revisit: County Mayo"	County Mayo, Ireland	Sean McDonnell	Sean McDonnell	29 October 2024
112	4	"Revisit: Utah"	Canyonlands National Park, Utah, United States	Sean McDonnell	Sean McDonnell	6 November 2024
113	5	"Revisit: Rathlin Island"	Rathlin Island, Northern Ireland	Sean McDonnell	Sean McDonnell	12 November 2024
114	6	"Revisit: Suffolk"	Suffolk, England	Sean McDonnell	Sean McDonnell	19 November 2024

=== Series 19 (2025) ===
No. overall	No. in series	Title	Location	Directed by	Series Producer	Original release date
115	1	"Bulgaria"	Bulgaria	Sean McDonnell	Harry Lansdown	7 January 2025
116	2	"New South Wales"	New South Wales, Australia	Sean McDonnell	Harry Lansdown	14 January 2025
117	3	"Italy"	Piedmont, Italy	Sean McDonnell	Harry Lansdown	21 January 2025
118	4	"Australia - Fort Grey"	Fort Grey, Australia	Sean McDonnell	Harry Lansdown	4 February 2025
119	5	"Roswell, New Mexico"	Roswell, New Mexico, United States	Sean McDonnell	Harry Lansdown	11 February 2025
120	6	"Isle of Wight"	Isle of Wight, England, United Kingdom	Sean McDonnell	Harry Lansdown	25 February 2025
121	7	"Utah"	Utah, United States	Sean McDonnell	Harry Lansdown	4 March 2025
122	8	"Morocco"	Morocco	Sean McDonnell	Harry Lansdown	18 March 2025
123	9	"Spain"	Spain	Sean McDonnell	Harry Lansdown	25 March 2025
124	10	"Maine"	Maine, United States	Sean McDonnell	Harry Lansdown	9 April 2025

=== Series 20 (2025) ===
No. overall	No. in series	Title	Location	Directed by	Series Producer	Original release date
125	1	"Botswana"	Makgadikgadi Pan, Botswana	Ita Fitzgerald	Sean McDonnell	14 August 2025
126	2	"Japan"	Kyushu, Japan	Ita Fitzgerald	Sean McDonnell	28 August 2025
127	3	"Thailand"	Chiang Dao, Thailand	Ita Fitzgerald	Sean McDonnell	4 September 2025

=== Series 21 (2026) ===
No. overall	No. in series	Title	Location	Editor	Producer & Director	Original release date
128	1	"Uganda"	Bulago Island, Lake Victoria, Uganda	Melanie Jankes Golden	Jo Young	15 January 2026
129	2	"Norway"	Norway	Alexis Anoyrkatis	Natalie Wilkinson	22 January 2026
130	3	"Montana"	Gunslinger Gulch, Montana	Stephen Moore	Dimitri Collingridge	29 January 2026
131	4	"Cheshire"	Cheshire, Northern England	Alexis Anoyrkatis	Natalie Wilkinson	5 February 2026
132	5	"Tenerife"	Arico, Tenerife	Melanie Jankes Golden	Jo Young	12 February 2026
133	6	"Missouri"	Missouri	Stephen Moore	Sean McDonnell	24 February 2026
134	7	"French Polynesia"	Ahe, French Polynesia	Melanie Jankes Golden	Sean McDonnell	13 October 2026
135	8	"Norway"	Norway	Alexis Anoyrkatis	Natalie Wilkinson	20 October 2026
136	9	"Chilean Patagonia"	Chilean Patagonia	Melanie Jankes Golden	Dimitri Collingridge	27 October 2026
137	10	"France"	Vienne, France	Stephen Moore	Jo Young	3 November 2026
