= James Cracknell =

British rower

James Cracknell OBE
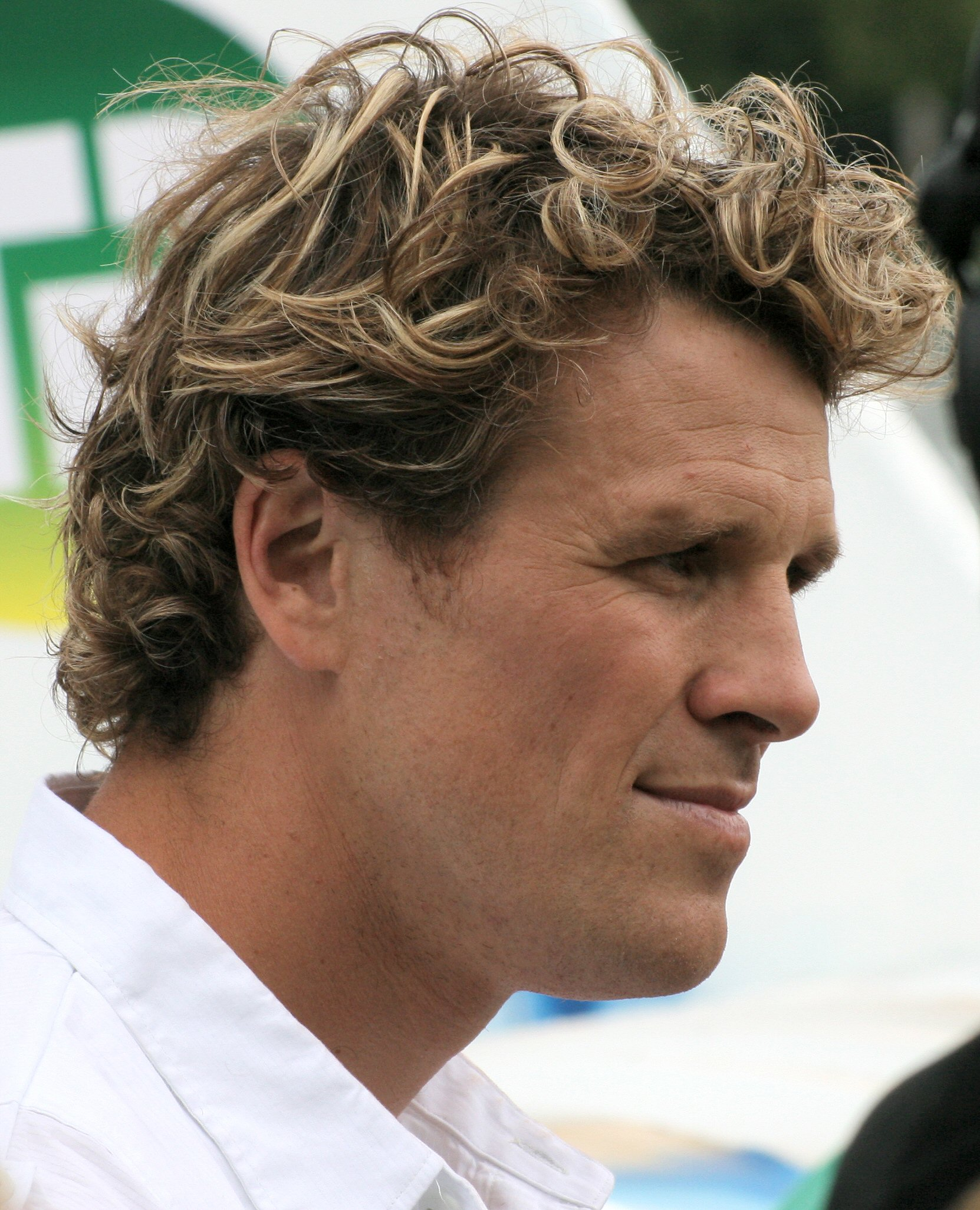
- Cracknell in August 2009

Personal information
- Nationality: British
- Born: 5 May 1972 (age 54) Sutton, London, England
- Education: Kingston Grammar School; University of Reading; UCL Institute of Education; Brunel University London; Peterhouse, Cambridge
- Height: 1.93 m (6 ft 4 in)
- Weight: 98 kg (216 lb)
- Spouses: Bev Turner (m. 2002; div. 2019) Jordan Connell (m. 2021)

Sport
- Country: Great Britain
- Sport: Men's rowing
- Event: Coxless fours
- Club: Leander Club
- Coached by: Jürgen Gröbler; Mark Banks
Medal record
Men's rowing
Representing Great Britain
Olympic Games
Gold medal – first place	2000 Sydney	Coxless four
Gold medal – first place	2004 Athens	Coxless four
World Rowing Championships
Gold medal – first place	1997 Aiguebelette	Coxless four
Gold medal – first place	1998 Cologne	Coxless four
Gold medal – first place	1999 St. Catharines	Coxless four
Gold medal – first place	2001 Lucerne	Coxless pair
Gold medal – first place	2001 Lucerne	Coxed pair
Gold medal – first place	2002 Seville	Coxless pair
The Boat Race
Gold medal – first place	The Boat Race 2019	Cambridge

James Edward Cracknell, OBE (born 5 May 1972) is a British rowing and endurance athlete, double Olympic gold medalist and winner of six world championship titles. Cracknell was appointed OBE for "services to sport" in the 2005 New Year Honours List.

== Biography ==
Cracknell began rowing whilst attending the independent Kingston Grammar School and rowed at the Junior World Championships in 1989 and 1990, winning a gold medal in 1990. He graduated from the University of Reading as a Bachelor of Science (BSc) in Human Geography in 1993, followed by a PGCE at the Institute of Education and a Master of Science (MSc) from Brunel University in 1999. Moving into the senior squad, Cracknell made numerous appearances in the World Rowing Championships; however, he did not win any medals prior to the 1996 Summer Olympics. He qualified in the double scull for the 1996 Games, but fell ill with tonsillitis and was unable to race. In 1997, he won a seat in the men's coxless fours, with Steve Redgrave, Matthew Pinsent and Tim Foster. With this crew, he won the World Rowing Championships in 1997, 1998 and 1999 (with Ed Coode replacing the injured Foster), and finally the gold medal at the 2000 Summer Olympics. In August 2000, the month prior to winning gold in Sydney, he took part in a 3-part BBC documentary entitled Gold Fever. This followed the coxless four team in the years leading up to the Olympics, including video diaries recording the highs and lows in their quest for gold.

With Redgrave then having retired, Cracknell swapped from rowing on strokeside to bowside to join Pinsent in the coxless pairs. The pair won the World Championships in 2001, when they also won the coxed pairs, and 2002. However, in 2003 a disappointing season was capped by a failure to win the World Championships, and Pinsent and Cracknell were shifted into the coxless four, with Steve Williams and Alex Partridge. Ed Coode replaced the injured Partridge in time for the 2004 Summer Olympics and this crew won the gold medal in Athens, beating world champions Canada by 0.08s.

He came second in the pairs division of the 2005–2006 Atlantic Rowing Race in "Spirit of EDF Energy", partnered by Ben Fogle. Although they took first place in the line honours of the pairs event (overall, they were third to finish the race behind the two men's fours), the use of ballast water during the race resulted in the pair being moved to second position of the pairs event in accordance with the race rules. The event helped raise money for Children in Need.

They made landfall in Antigua at 07.13 GMT on 19 January 2006, a crossing time of 49 days, 19 hours and 8 minutes. In February 2006, he announced his decision to retire from competitive rowing. Shortly after, Through Hell and High Water, a BBC/Twofour television programme of Cracknell and Fogle's experience of the Atlantic race, was aired. The pair wrote a book called The Crossing: Conquering the Atlantic in the World's Toughest Rowing Race, about their trip.

On 4 March 2006, Cracknell's home was burgled: his Olympic gold medals were stolen, together with his wedding ring and a computer containing 20,000 words of a new book and family photographs. The gold medals were subsequently recovered by a neighbour's dog where the thief had discarded them. The thief, Mark Murphy, 30, was caught and jailed.

He ran the London Marathon on 23 April 2006, in a time of 3 hours, finishing over an hour ahead of his rowing teammate Matthew Pinsent.

In January 2008 Cracknell set up Threshold Sports with Julian Mack and Charlie Beauchamp.

In December 2008 he set off yet again with former teammate from the Atlantic Row, Ben Fogle, and Dr Ed Coats (the winner of a nationwide search), this time to take part in the inaugural Amundsen Omega3 South Pole Race. The team traversed the 473.6 miles suffering frostbite, infected blisters, dramatic weight-loss, pneumonia and exhaustion and came second only to a pair of Norwegians (over 20 hours). The BBC aired a 5 x 1-hour, prime-time Sunday night series of the adventure, On Thin Ice (Twofour), in June–July 2009. The series was accompanied by a self-penned book of the race, Race to the Pole (MacMillan).

In July 2008 Cracknell competed in the European Triathlon Championships for GBR for his age group and in November 2009 he took part in the New York Marathon. In April 2009, James completed the 125-mile non-stop Devizes to Westminster Canoe Marathon in a two-man racing K2 kayak with canoe partner Bernie Shosbree.

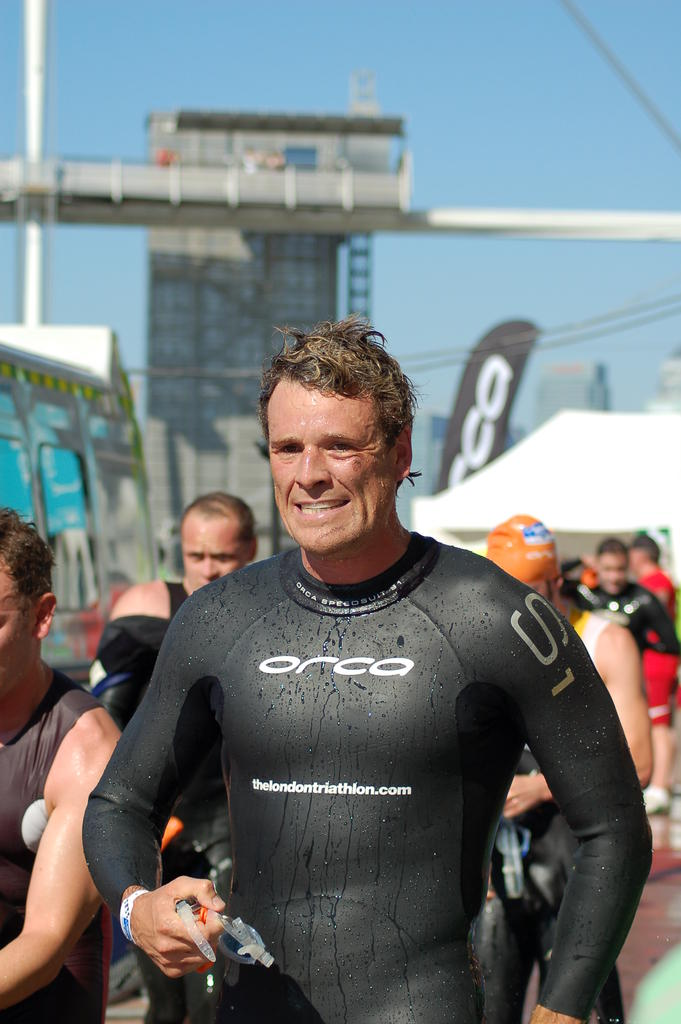
James Cracknell at the London Triathlon 2007

In August 2009 Cracknell attempted to break the non-stop Land's End to John O'Groats mixed tandem world record along with Olympic gold medallist Rebecca Romero. The pair got just past Johnstone Bridge in Scotland before being forced to stop due to problems with Romero's knees. They were on course to break the record by over three hours. The attempt was to launch the 2010 Ride Across Britain that Cracknell's company organised

In April 2010 Cracknell became the highest placed Briton ever in the 25-year history of the Marathon des Sables, finishing 12th. His exploits were filmed for a Discovery Channel documentary The Toughest Race on Earth to be aired in October 2010. This highest ever placing was beaten in 2013 by another Briton, Danny Kendall who finished 10th.

Six months after his cycling accident which damaged his frontal lobe (see below), Cracknell competed in the Yukon Arctic Ultra. He finished second in the 430-mile race across the frozen Alaskan countryside, beaten only by British cyclist Alan Sheldon who beat Cracknell's 163:20 with his own 99:30. Cracknell's participation in the race was filmed for the documentary The Coldest Race on Earth aired on the Discovery Channel.

Cracknell ran the 2012 London Marathon in just under three hours, one of the fastest celebrities, but behind Nell McAndrew. In 2017, he ran a time of 2:43:12, making him one of the fastest notable non-professional marathon runners.

In 2018, Cracknell enrolled at Peterhouse, Cambridge to study for a MPhil degree in human evolution. On 7 April 2019, Cracknell became the oldest competitor, and oldest winner, for Cambridge in the 2019 Boat Race; at the age of 46 he became the oldest rower in the event's history by 10 years.

In 2019, Cracknell participated in the seventeenth series of Strictly Come Dancing, where he was partnered with professional dancer Luba Mushtuk. He was the first celebrity to be eliminated from the show after losing the dance off to David James and Nadiya Bychkova. He competed in the third series of Celebrity SAS: Who Dares Wins. In 2021, Cracknell again ran the London Marathon with a time of 2:55:39.

== Presenting and journalism ==
Cracknell has presented sport on ITV, Channel 4 and BBC. He covered The Boat Race 2007 with Mark Durden-Smith for ITV and is the presenter of ITV's coverage of the British Superbike Championship. He is also the main presenter of Channel 4's Red Bull Air Race World Series coverage. He is a contracted columnist with The Daily Telegraph writing about various topics including sport, motoring, gardening, cookery and others.

== Charitable activities ==
From 27 February 2008, Cracknell covered over 1,400 miles from Britain to Africa in 10 days, rowing, cycling and swimming. He rowed from Dover, England to Cap Gris Nez, France, then cycled to Tarifa, Spain, and finally swam across the Strait of Gibraltar from Tarifa to Punta Cires, Morocco. The comedian David Walliams joined him for the final part of his journey providing support from his previous experience of swimming the English Channel. The money raised by the challenge went towards the BBC's Sport Relief charity, with highlights of the action broadcast on 14 March. He was the celebrity guest at The WiG GiG which raise over £10,000 for Macmillan Cancer Support.

In January 2009, Cracknell took part in the Amundsen Omega 3 South Pole Race with his TV presenter friend Ben Fogle and Dr Ed Coats as members of Team QinetiQ, finishing in second, 20 hours behind the winning Norwegian team. The race and the reasons behind was broadcast on BBC Television during summer 2009 in the series On Thin Ice. The trio raised funds for the children's medical research charity Sparks, chosen as the charity partner in memory of Cracknell's niece, Eva, who died at six days old after suffering oxygen deprivation at birth.

On Saturday 3 October 2009, Cracknell and Ben Fogle started a 60-hour (estimated) journey from Edinburgh to London riding a rickshaw in support of SSAFA. They aimed to arrive in time for the Pride of Britain Awards ceremony on Monday 5 October 2009. They endured storm force gales in Scotland and Northumberland on their first day of the 450-mile ride. Early on the last day they made a stop at Etonbury Middle School in Arlesey, off the A1 road to London, where about 100 children welcomed them and to wave them on their way.

== Advocacy and legal work ==
Since 2024, Cracknell has served as an ambassador for Coulthursts, a UK law firm specialising exclusively in brain injury claims. Drawing on his own experience of traumatic brain injury (TBI), he has worked with the firm of brain injury solicitors to raise awareness of the need for early diagnosis and timely access to specialist rehabilitation.

As part of his role, Cracknell has appeared in a series of educational films and public awareness campaigns, highlighting the benefits of advanced brain imaging that has revealed damage previously undetected by standard scans. He has stated that earlier access to such diagnostic tools could have significantly improved his post-injury recovery and family life. His advocacy has aimed to promote the wider adoption of these technologies and reforms in the medical treatment of TBI patients.

1) James Cracknell joins Coulthursts team in new ambassadorial role

2) James Cracknell: ‘If I’d had these scans 15 years ago, life would have been different’ – The Independent

== Cycling accident, helmet advocacy ==
On 20 July 2010, Cracknell was hit from behind by a petrol tanker whilst cycling during an attempt to cycle, row, run and swim from Los Angeles to New York within 18 days. The accident happened at around 5.30am on a quiet stretch of road outside Winslow, Arizona. He has attributed his survival to wearing a cycle helmet at the time. In the crash he suffered a contrecoup injury to the frontal lobes of his brain. In 2012 Cracknell and his then-wife wrote Touching Distance about his life before and after his brain injury, which has left him with epilepsy, a lost sense of smell and taste, and a changed, more volatile, personality. Since the accident he has been conspicuous in advocating the use of bicycle helmets.

== Politics ==
Having been a prominent supporter of the NOtoAV campaign in the 2011 United Kingdom Alternative Vote referendum, in June 2013 Cracknell revealed his intention to stand in the European Parliament election of 2014. He commented "The European Union is going to have an effect on my children and grandchildren. I'd like to think I can have an effect - bring a fresh perspective. It's not something I have to do, it's something I want to do."

In October 2013, Cracknell was announced as a Conservative Party candidate in South West England and Gibraltar, together with Ashley Fox, Julie Girling, Georgina Butler, Sophia Swire and Melissa Maynard. Although he was at number 3 on the Conservative party list, Cracknell was unsuccessful.

In May 2023, it was reported Cracknell was seeking to be the prospective parliamentary candidate for Henley at the 2024 general election, following the announcement of the retirement of John Howell. He was selected as the Conservative candidate for Colchester in September 2023. In the 2024 General Election, Cracknell lost to the Labour candidate by 8250 votes. Cracknell has stated he believes Britain could rejoin the EU in a generation.

== Personal life ==
In 2002, Cracknell married TV presenter Bev Turner. The couple had three children: a son and two daughters. They announced their separation on 29 March 2019 after 17 years of marriage. They were granted a decree nisi in their divorce proceedings in July of the same year.

In January 2021, he announced his engagement to Jordan Connell; they married in August 2021.

== Achievements ==
- Olympic Medals: 2 Gold
- World Championship Medals: 6 Gold
- Junior World Championship Medals: 1 Gold

=== Olympic games ===
- 2004 – Gold, Coxless Four (with Matthew Pinsent, Steve Williams, Ed Coode)
- 2000 – Gold, Coxless Four (with Matthew Pinsent, Tim Foster, Steve Redgrave)

=== World championships ===
- 2003 – 4th, Coxless Pair (with Matthew Pinsent)
- 2002 – Gold, Coxless Pair (with Matthew Pinsent)
- 2001 – Gold, Coxless Pair (with Matthew Pinsent)
- 2001 – Gold, Coxed Pair (with Matthew Pinsent, Neil Chugani)
- 1999 – Gold, Coxless Four (with Matthew Pinsent, Ed Coode, Steve Redgrave)
- 1998 – Gold, Coxless Four (with Matthew Pinsent, Tim Foster, Steve Redgrave)
- 1997 – Gold, Coxless Four (with Matthew Pinsent, Tim Foster, Steve Redgrave)
- 1995 – 10th, Double Sculls
- 1994 – 8th, Eight
- 1993 – 6th, Eight
- 1991 – 7th, Coxless Four (with John Garrett, Gavin Stewart, James Walker)

=== Junior world championships ===
- 1990 – Gold, Coxless Four
- 1989 – 10th, Coxed Pair

=== Boat Race ===
- 2019 - The Boat Race, rowing for the University of Cambridge

=== World Records ===
- 2020 - British Indoor Rowing Marathon Record for Heavyweight 40-49 Men

== Styles ==
- James Cracknell (1972–2001)
- James Cracknell, MBE (2001–2004)
- James Cracknell, OBE (2004-date)

=== National honour ===
- Officer of the Order of the British Empire (OBE)
