= Through Hell and High Water =

- Ben Fogle (left) and James Cracknell (right) after completing the race
- Genre: Documentary
- Directed by: Alexis Girardet
- Starring: James Cracknell; Ben Fogle; Julia Foster; Marina Hunt; Beverly Turner
- Country of origin: United Kingdom
- Original language: English
- No. of seasons: 1
- No. of episodes: 6

Production
- Executive producers: Karen Brown; Melanie Leach
- Producers: Neil Edwards; Alexis Girardet; Ahaeon O’Connell
- Running time: 29 minutes
- Production company: BBC

Original release
- Release: 13 February 2006

Through Hell and High Water is a BBC television programme that aired in the United Kingdom from 13 to 17 February 2006. Five half-hour morning programmes (9:30 – 10 am) on BBC1 followed James Cracknell (Olympic rower) and Ben Fogle (television presenter) in their attempt to cross the Atlantic Ocean in "Spirit of EDF Energy", a 24-foot rowing boat, with a half-hour summary programme during the evening of the final day on BBC2. The programme was produced by Twofour.

Cracknell and Fogle were competing in the 2005–2006 Atlantic Rowing Race. They were the third boat (two fours boats finished ahead of them) and the first pairs boat to cross the finishing line. They were later moved to second place for drinking their emergency water supply in accordance with the race rules. They finished in Antigua at 7:13 am GMT on 19 January 2006, with a crossing time of 49 days, 19 hours, 8 minutes.

It won a Royal Television Society award for best daytime programme.
