= Bruce Fogle =

Veterinarian and author (born 1944)

Bruce Fogle MBE
- Born: February 17, 1944 (age 82); Toronto, Ontario, Canada
- Education: Ontario Veterinary College; University of Guelph
- Occupation: Vet
- Spouse: Julia Foster
- Children: Emily, Tamara, and Ben Fogle
- Writing career
- Subjects: Pet care, travel

Bruce Fogle (born 17 February 1944) is a veterinarian and author of pet care books and travel narratives. Canadian by birth, he has lived and worked in London for over 40 years.

== Early life and education ==
Fogle was born in Toronto, Ontario, Canada, the son of Aileen (née Breslin) and Morris Fogle, a Scottish Jew, on 17 February 1944.

Bruce Fogle grew up and was educated in Toronto. He graduated in 1970 with a Doctor of veterinary medicine degree from the Ontario Veterinary College, University of Guelph in Guelph, Ontario.

== Career ==
After graduation, Fogle worked as a vet for the Zoological Society of London at London Zoo. In 1973 Fogle set up his own practice, the Portman Veterinary Clinic. This expanded and is now named the London Veterinary Clinic.

Outside his profession, Fogle is the co-founder and vice-chairman of the charity Hearing Dogs for Deaf People. In 2004, he was appointed a Member of the Order of the British Empire for services to deaf people. He is chairman of Humane Society International, which celebrates animals and confronts cruelty worldwide. For services to pets, pet owners and veterinarians, the British Small Animal Veterinary Association has awarded Fogle Honorary Life Membership. He holds honorary memberships in other national veterinary associations.

Fogle has written dozens of books about dogs and cats, including encyclopaedias of breeds and how to care for and live with them. Some of his many titles include Pets and Their People, Natural Cat Care, The Encyclopaedia of the Cat, The Encyclopaedia of the Dog, and ASPCA Complete Dog Care Manual. Fogle has been published in journals with such works as Search-and-Rescue Dogs in 1988, Pet Loss: A Survey of the Attitudes and Feelings of Practicing Veterinarians in 1990, and The Changing Roles of Animals in Western Society: Influences upon and from the Veterinary Profession in 1999.

Fogle has also been Veterinary Consultant to Microsoft Encarta, and Veterinary Advisor to the Encyclopædia Britannica.

For many years Fogle appeared regularly on Jimmy Young's BBC Radio 2 show. He continues the same role on Jeremy Vine's radio programme.

== Personal life ==
Fogle married actress Julia Foster in 1973. The couple have three children: Emily, Tamara, and Ben Fogle, a television broadcaster.
