= Hambleden Rural District =

Historical rural district

Coordinates: 51.571879°N 0.867897°W

Hambleden
- Rural district
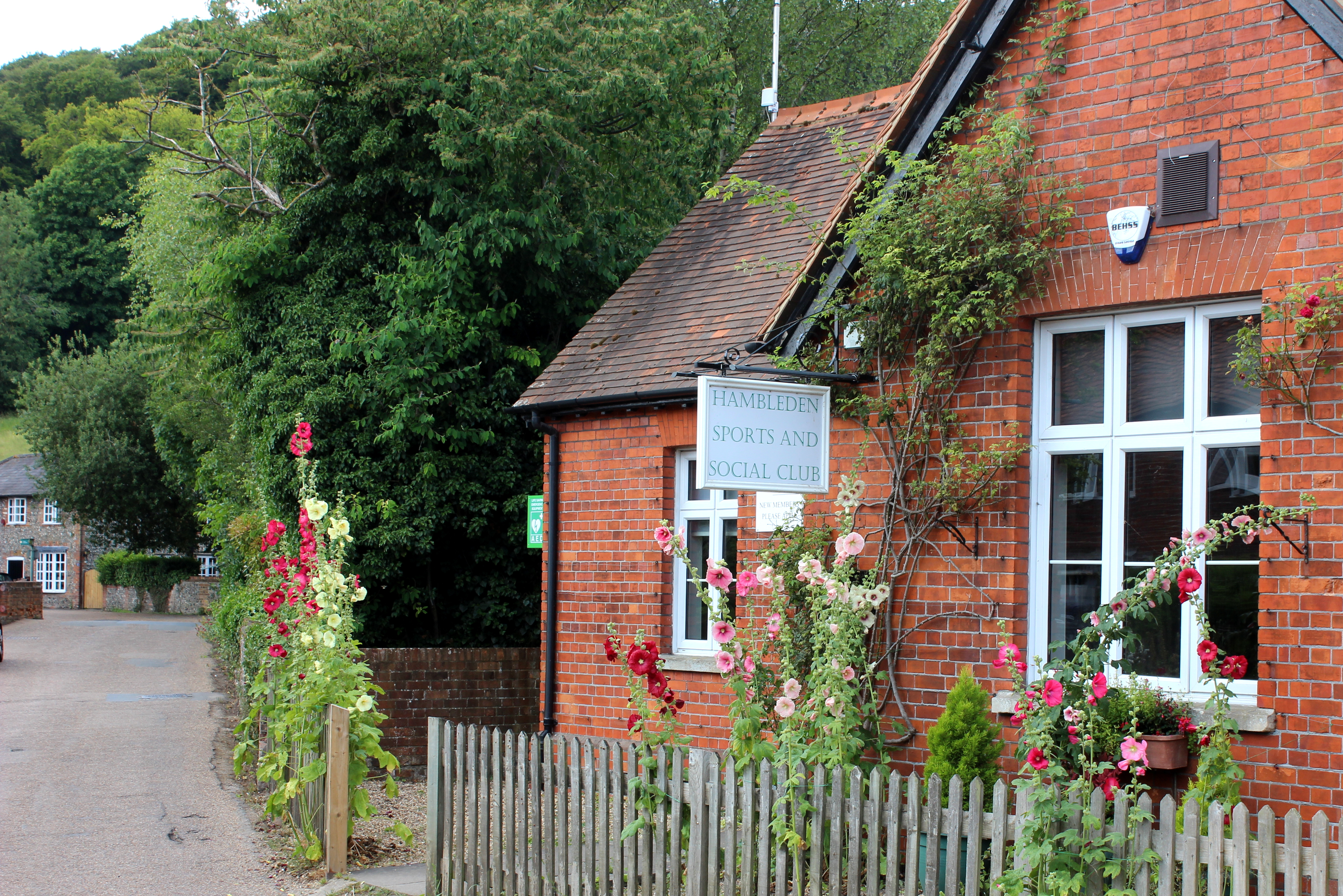
- Hambleden Institute (now Sports and Social Club), council's meeting place
- Area
  - 1911: 11,253 acres (45.5 km^{2})
  - 1931: 11,253 acres (45.5 km^{2})
- Population
  - 1901: 2,139
  - 1931: 1,956
- History
  - Created: 28 December 1894
  - Abolished: 31 March 1934
  - Succeeded by: Wycombe Rural District

Hambleden Rural District was a rural district in Buckinghamshire, England from 1894 to 1934, covering an area in the south-west of the county.

== History ==
Hambleden Rural District had its origins in the Henley-on-Thames Poor Law Union, which had been created in 1835. The poor law union was mostly in Oxfordshire but included one parish in Berkshire and three parishes in Buckinghamshire. Poor law unions formed the basis for sanitary districts when they were created in 1872, with the area becoming the Henley Rural Sanitary District, administered by the board of guardians for the poor law union, which was based at the Union Workhouse on West Hill in Henley. Under the Local Government Act 1894, rural sanitary districts became rural districts on 28 December 1894, and where sanitary districts straddled county boundaries they were split to create separate rural districts for the parts in each county. The Hambleden Rural District was therefore created covering the three Buckinghamshire parishes from the Henley Rural Sanitary District. The Oxfordshire part of the old rural sanitary district became Henley Rural District, whilst the single Berkshire parish (Remenham) was added to Wokingham Rural District.

Hambleden Rural District Council held its first meeting on 1 January 1895 at the workhouse in Henley, when William Dalziel Mackenzie of Fawley Court was appointed the first chairman.

== Parishes ==
The district comprised the three civil parishes of:

- Fawley
- Hambleden
- Medmenham

== Premises ==
For its first few meetings, the council met at the workhouse or at its clerk's office in Henley. From April 1895 onwards it generally met at the Institute in Hambleden. Administrative functions were carried out at Bank Chambers, 12 Hart Street, Henley, which was the office of the solicitor who acted as clerk to the council.

== Abolition ==
The district was abolished by a County Review Order in 1934, the parishes being added to the Wycombe Rural District.
