= Hearing Dogs for Deaf People =

UK charitable organization

- Founded: 1982
- Founder: Dr. Bruce Fogle, Lady Beatrice Wright
- Type: Charitable organization
- Location: Saunderton, Buckinghamshire, United Kingdom
- Region served: UK
- Key people: Tracy Griffin (Chief Executive)
- Formerly called: Hearing Dogs for the Deaf

Hearing Dogs for Deaf People is a UK charity which trains dogs to alert deaf people to a variety of sounds.

The Charity's dogs provide emotional support through companionship, and practical support by alerting deaf people to life-saving sounds like the smoke alarm, and important sounds such as the oven timer, baby monitor and text messages. Their burgundy coats also signal to the public that they are with a deaf person.

Since its inception in 1982 the Charity – which was co-founded by vet Dr. Bruce Fogle (father of Ben Fogle) – has created nearly 2,500 hearing dogs partnerships. There are currently around 1,000 hearing dog partnerships across the UK.

In August 2017, Hearing Dogs for Deaf People merged with Hearing Link, another leading hearing loss charity.

== Service ==
Hearing Dogs for Deaf People helps people with hearing loss, by providing them with Assistance Dogs that can accompany them wherever they want to go. Their dogs are distinctive in that they wear burgundy coats with the Hearing Dogs logo, which also signals to other people that the person they're with is deaf.

For the first year of their lives, their dogs live with volunteers, who look after the dogs, introduce them to new experiences, and give them basic training, a process called 'socialising'.

After around a year, the dogs go on to advanced training, in which they are taught to alert people to sounds, called 'soundwork'. They do this by nudging the deaf person with their nose, then leading them to the source of the sound. An exception to this is when they alert to fire sirens or smoke alarms: the dogs lie down instead, telling the deaf person that there is an alarm, but not leading them into danger.

Since the merger with Hearing Link, the Charity has also been able to help people with a wider range of hearing loss, who might not want or need a dog in their lives, but who would benefit from assistive technologies, support and practical advice.

== History ==
Hearing Dogs for the Deaf (as it was initially known) was officially launched at Crufts in 1982, as a three-year pilot scheme by Dr. Bruce Fogle and Lady Beatrice Wright.

In 1986 Hearing Dogs was granted full charitable status and bought its first property in Lewknor, Oxfordshire.

In 1992 Anne, Princess Royal became Royal Patron, a title she holds to this day, both for Hearing Dogs and Hearing Link.

In 1994 the Charity opened its northern training centre, and five years later established its southern training centre and offices at The Grange, in Saunderton, Buckinghamshire, UK.

In 1996 the Charity rebranded as Hearing Dogs for Deaf People.
