= On Thin Ice (TV series) =

- No. of episodes: 5

Original release
- Network: BBC Two
- Release: June 2009 – July 2009

On Thin Ice is a documentary following a team of three consisting of Ben Fogle, James Cracknell, and Ed Coats in their race across Antarctica to the South Pole. The series covers the whole experience, beginning with training efforts in Switzerland and vigorous exercises elsewhere. The team began their race to the South Pole shortly after New Year's Day 2009. The series also covers the various calamities experienced by Ben Fogle, who only a short while before the trip had contracted a highly dangerous tropical skin-eating disease (Cutaneous leishmaniasis).

The series was aired on BBC Two during the months of June and July 2009.

The series consists of five episodes. Episodes one to three focus on the team's preparations and training for the event, particularly the recruitment of the third team member (provisionally Jonny Lee Miller, whose work commitments led to his replacement by Ed Coats). Episodes four and five focus on the race itself and notably the physical and emotional strains put on the individual men, and team as a whole.

Internationally, the series premiered in Australia on 18 February 2017 on BBC Knowledge.
