= Will Burrard-Lucas =

British photographer

- Education: Imperial College London, MSci Physics (2006)
- Occupation: Wildlife Photographer
- Website: www.willbl.com

Will Burrard-Lucas (born 2 September 1983), is a British wildlife photographer and entrepreneur. He is known for developing devices, such as BeetleCam and camera traps, which enable him to capture close-up photographs of wildlife.

== Early life and education ==
Burrard-Lucas was born in the UK and spent part of his childhood living in Tanzania. During this time he became interested in wildlife and nature. He attended Sevenoaks School in Kent before going on to study Physics at Imperial College London.

== Career ==
Burrard-Lucas has been a full-time wildlife photographer since 2010. Previously, he worked for a Big Four accounting firm in London.

Burrard-Lucas works with various conservation NGOs including WWF, African Parks and The Ethiopian Wolf Conservation Programme.

=== Inventions ===
In 2009, Burrard-Lucas created BeetleCam, a remote-control camera buggy, and used it to take close-up photographs of elephants, lions and buffalo in Tanzania. In 2011, he returned to Africa to photograph lions in Kenya. He has since used BeetleCam to photograph wildlife in other African countries, including leopards in Zambia and African wild dogs in Zimbabwe. In 2015, Burrard-Lucas used BeetleCam to photograph wildlife at night in Liuwa Plain National Park in Zambia. This series went on to win the Professional Natural World Category in the Sony World Photography Awards.

While living in Zambia in 2012–2013, Burrard-Lucas also developed high-quality camera traps for photographing rare and nocturnal animals. These camera traps were based on a passive infrared sensor and took photos using a standard DSLR or mirrorless camera. In 2015, his work with camera traps led to a collaboration with WWF to photograph elusive animals in Namibia.

In 2014, Burrard-Lucas founded a company, Camtraptions Ltd, which produces BeetleCams and camera trap systems for photographers and filmmakers.

In July 2019, Burrard-Lucas announced his intentions to take two new versions of BeetleCam back to the African continent in search of lions for a new project.

=== Ethiopian Wolf Project ===
In 2011, Burrard-Lucas collaborated with Rebecca Jackrel, a nature photographer from the US, to document endangered Ethiopian wolves in the Bale Mountains of Ethiopia. The project was funded via a successful Kickstarter campaign which raised $13,705. The photographers spent more than a month documenting the lives of the wolves and the work of the Ethiopian Wolf Conservation Programme. The project culminated in a book titled The Ethiopian Wolf: Hope at the Edge of Extinction.

=== Tsavo Elephants ===
In August 2017, Burrard-Lucas started working with Tsavo Trust in Kenya to photograph the last "Big Tusker" elephants in Tsavo. During the project, Burrard-Lucas used his BeetleCam to photograph F_MU1, a female elephant with extremely long tusks. The project resulted in a book, titled Land of Giants, which was published in 2019.

=== Melanistic African Leopard ===
In February 2019, Burrard-Lucas captured the first high-quality camera trap photographs of a melanistic African leopard, also known as a black panther, in Laikipia Wilderness Camp in Kenya. Previously, only one such leopard had been photographed in Africa, in 1909 in Addis Ababa, Ethiopia. The project resulted in a book, titled The Black Leopard, published in 2021.

== Awards ==
- 1st Place, Living Planet Category, Travel Photographer of the Year, 2021
- 1st Place, Animal Portraits Category, Nature Photographer of the Year, 2021
- Highly Commended, Animal Portraits Category, Wildlife Photographer of the Year, 2021
- Grand Title Winner, MontPhoto Awards, 2021
- 1st Place, Dusk to Dawn Category, Travel Photographer of the Year, 2019
- 1st Place, Animals in their Environment Category, Siena International Photo Awards, 2019
- Highly Commended, GDT European Wildlife Photographer of the Year, 2016, 2017 & 2018
- 1st Place, Natural World Category, Professional Competition, Sony World Photography Awards, 2017
- Highly Commended, TIMElapse Award, Wildlife Photographer of the Year, 2014

== Publications ==
- The Ethiopian Wolf: Hope at the Edge of Extinction. 2013. ISBN 978-0981581316.
- Top Wildlife Sites of the World. 2015. ISBN 978-1921517594.
- Land of Giants. 2019. ISBN 978-1912751006.
- The Black Leopard: My Quest to Photograph One of Africa's Most Elusive Big Cats. 2021. ISBN 978-1797202914.
