= 2015 Wycombe District Council election =

2015 UK local government election

Map of the results

The 2015 Wycombe District Council election took place on 7 May 2015 to elect members of Wycombe District Council in England. This was on the same day as other local elections.

The Conservatives retained control of the council with the Labour Party replacing the Liberal Democrats as the largest opposition party. It also saw the newly formed East Wycombe Independent Party take 3 seats.

== Ward Results ==
Political composition of the council after May 2015

=== Abbey ===
Candidate	Party	Votes	%
Lesley Clarke	CON	2278	19
Alan Hill	CON	2015	17
Mahboob Hussain	CON	1742	14
Mark Ferris	LAB	1434	12
Mohammed Rafiq	LAB	1391	12
Israr Rashid	LAB	1314	11
Neil Denham	GRN	611	5
Alison Harmsworth	LD	518	4
Robert Perkins	LD	421	3
Bob Paddon	LD	362	3
