= Marina Chapman =

British woman (born circa 1950)

- Born: circa 1950
- Notable work: The Girl With No Name
- Children: 2

Marina Chapman (born circa 1950 in Colombia) is a Colombian-born British woman known to have spent much of her early childhood in the jungle and survived among and solely around a group of capuchin monkeys.

== Personal life ==
There are no real records of Marina Chapman’s birth in legal documents, due to her being born during the La Violencia civil war in Colombia that was fought primarily in the countryside. Just days before her fifth birthday, she was taken away from her village (the name of which she was too young to have learned) and taken to a jungle, which may have been part of the Amazon rainforest, by an unknown group of persons, where she was left behind and abandoned, for a reason that she did not understand. She was not able to return home and could not leave the jungle, so she wandered alone in the jungle, for a considerable period of time.

Due to lack of food in the jungle, she could not find food and began to suffer from severe malnutrition and soon suffered total weakness and later starvation. In her biography she recalls contracting food poisoning after eating tamarind, and writes that an elderly capuchin monkey had led her to a water source which helped her to recover. She says that the capuchin monkeys subsequently befriended her and that she was able to survive by copying their ways, by learning where to find edible food to eat and how to climb trees. She struggled to adapt to the new environment.

One day, she was discovered by a group of hunters, who she approached for help. They took her out of the jungle and kept her captive until she was sent to the city of Cúcuta.

In Cúcuta, she was sold to a brothel and was forced to become a prostitute. Later, she either escaped or was expelled. She then lived on the streets of Cúcuta, and subsequently became a slave of a Colombian mafia family.

A neighbour, Maruja, rescued her and sent her to Bogotá, the capital city of Colombia, to live with one of her daughters. Maruja's daughter Maria adopted Marina when she was approximately 14. The family had connections to the city of Bradford in Yorkshire, England, through the textile industry, and in 1977 sent their children there with Chapman to be their nanny.

Chapman currently lives in Bradford. She married a scientist from the area, with whom she has two daughters.

== Analysis ==
Carlos Conde, a professor in Colombia, performed a test using pictures of Chapman's adopted family and capuchin monkeys that, he claims, strongly suggested that Chapman was telling the truth. The University of London psychology professor Chris French argued that Chapman may be affected by false memories.

== In popular culture ==
National Geographic created the documentary Woman Raised By Monkeys. It premiered on Thursday 12 December 2013.

Chapman collaborated on her autobiography The Girl With No Name (published 2013 by Mainstream Publishing), with the help of her musician daughter Vanessa Forero and writer Lynne Barrett-lee. Chapman and her daughter both appeared on BBC Breakfast Time in 2013 to promote the book which had initially been rejected by several publishers because they suspected it was not authentic, but it went on to be published internationally.

Kate McKinnon performed a satirical impression of Chapman on the Weekend Update segment of the April 13, 2013 episode of Saturday Night Live.

== See also ==
- List of solved missing person cases (1950–1969)
