= BeetleCam =

Remote controlled buggy with camera

2013 BeetleCam Classic.

The BeetleCam is a remote controlled buggy with a DSLR or mirrorless camera mounted on top which can be used to film and photograph wildlife at very close range.

== History ==
Created by Will Burrard-Lucas, its first shots were released in 2010 in a series called "The Adventures of BeetleCam." It filmed African wildlife in the Ruaha and Katavi National Parks in Tanzania. One of the cameras was destroyed in an encounter with a lion.

Will Burrard-Lucas and his brother, Matt, returned to Africa in 2011 with two improved BeetleCams, with the aim of focusing on lions. During this project they created a set of pictures of feeding lions and playful cubs. This series was first released in 2012 in an article called "BeetleCam vs the Lions of the Masai Mara". BeetleCam Mark II used a Canon EOS-1Ds Mark III.

In 2012, Burrard-Lucas moved to Zambia and used a new version of the BeetleCam to photograph leopards and other animals, primarily in South Luangwa National Park.

In 2013, Will Burrard-Lucas founded Camtraptions Ltd. and started producing BeetleCams for other wildlife photographers and filmmakers.
