= Gadács =

Gadács Gadatsch (in German)
- Village
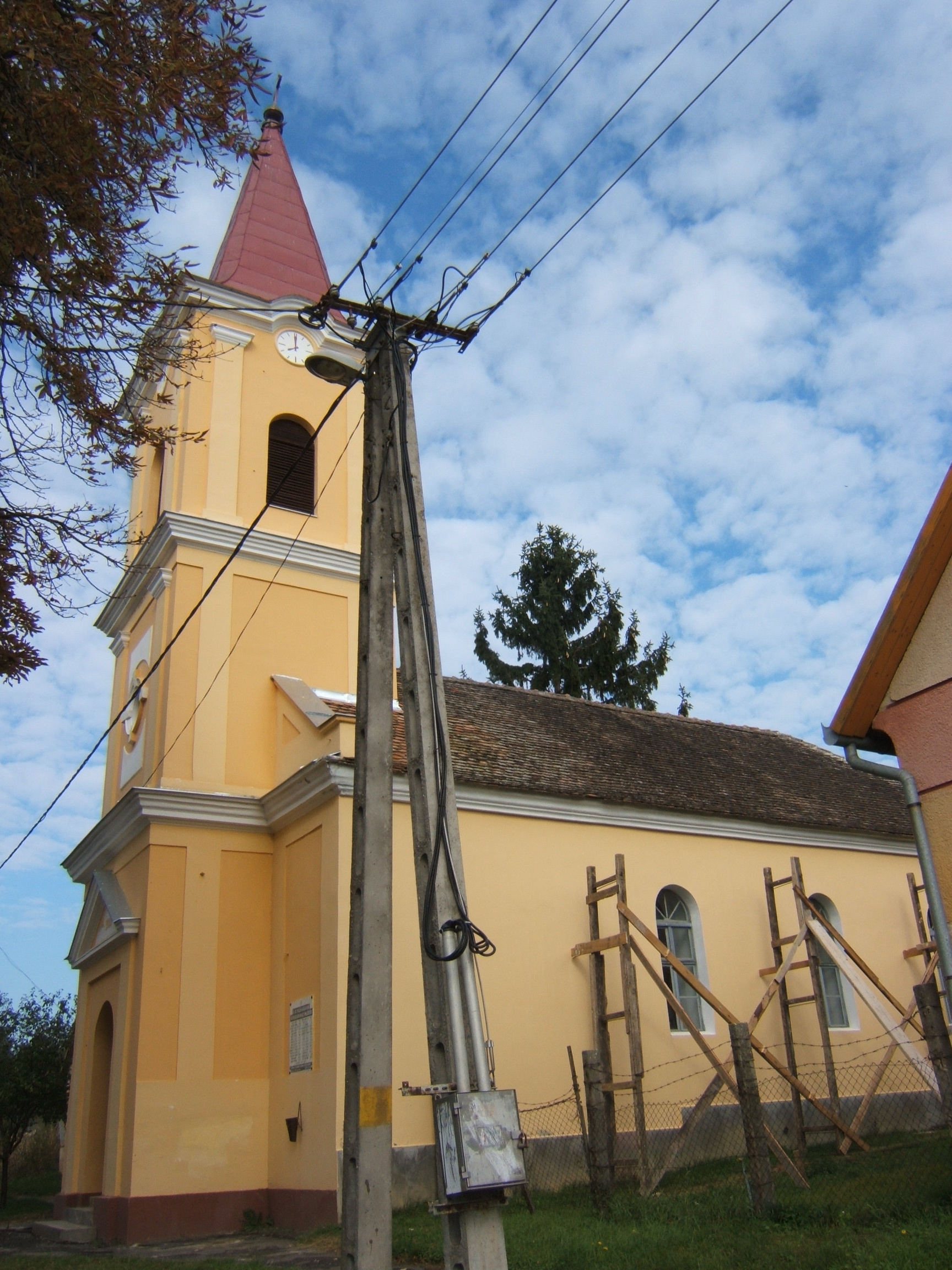
- Lutheran church of Gadács

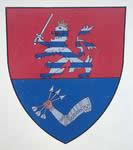
- Coat of arms

- Location of Somogy county in Hungary

- Location of Gadács
- Coordinates: 46.54010°N 18.00516°E
- Country: Hungary
- Region: Southern Transdanubia
- County: Somogy
- District: Kaposvár
- RC Diocese: Kaposvár

Area
  - Total: 3.86 km^{2} (1.49 sq mi)

Population (2017)
  - Total: 92
  - Density: 24/km^{2} (62/sq mi)
- Demonym: gadácsi
- Time zone: UTC+1 (CET)
  - Summer (DST): UTC+2 (CEST)
- Postal code: 7276
- Area code: (+36) 82
- NUTS 3 code: HU232
- MP: Mihály Witzmann (Fidesz)

Gadács (German: Gadatsch) is a village in Somogy county, Hungary.

== Etymology ==
The village got its name from its first owner, Gudas which was also the medieval name of the settlement. Later it changed to Gadács.

== Geography ==
It lies east of Igló, between Somogyacsa and Somogyszil.

== History ==
It was first mentioned in 1338 as a possession of the Dömös Chapter as Gudas. In the Middle Ages it was part of Tolna County. In the tax registration of 1542 it was referred to as a settlement in Tolna County. According to the tax registration of the Ottoman Porte it had 9 households in 1563, then 10 households in the tax registrations of 1573–1574, 1578 and 1580 respectively. Between 1701 and 1703 this territory was uninhabited and belonged to the Komáromy family. Lutheran Germans settled in the village in the 18th century who mostly came from other parts of Tolna County. In 1726 Gadács was owned by János Fekete, in 1733 by the Hunyadi family, finally between 1757 and 1766 by János Hunyadi. Until 1848 it was part of Somogyszil and later became independent.

In the 1930s 447 people lived there in 91 households.

== Coat of arms ==
Its coat of arms refers mainly to the re-establishment of the village after the Turkish occupation. Gadács was depopulated under Turkish rule, leading the landlords to invite German farming families. This can be seen as the lion motif, which indicates the original residence of the German population, the state of Hesse in Germany. The armored arm with the three arrows, however, comes from the coat of arms of the Hunyadi family to remember the then landowner of Gadács.

== Main sights ==
- Lutheran Church (built in the 19th century)
