= Wycombe District =

Former non-metropolitan district in England

Coordinates: 51°38′19″N 0°48′28″W

- Non-metropolitan district
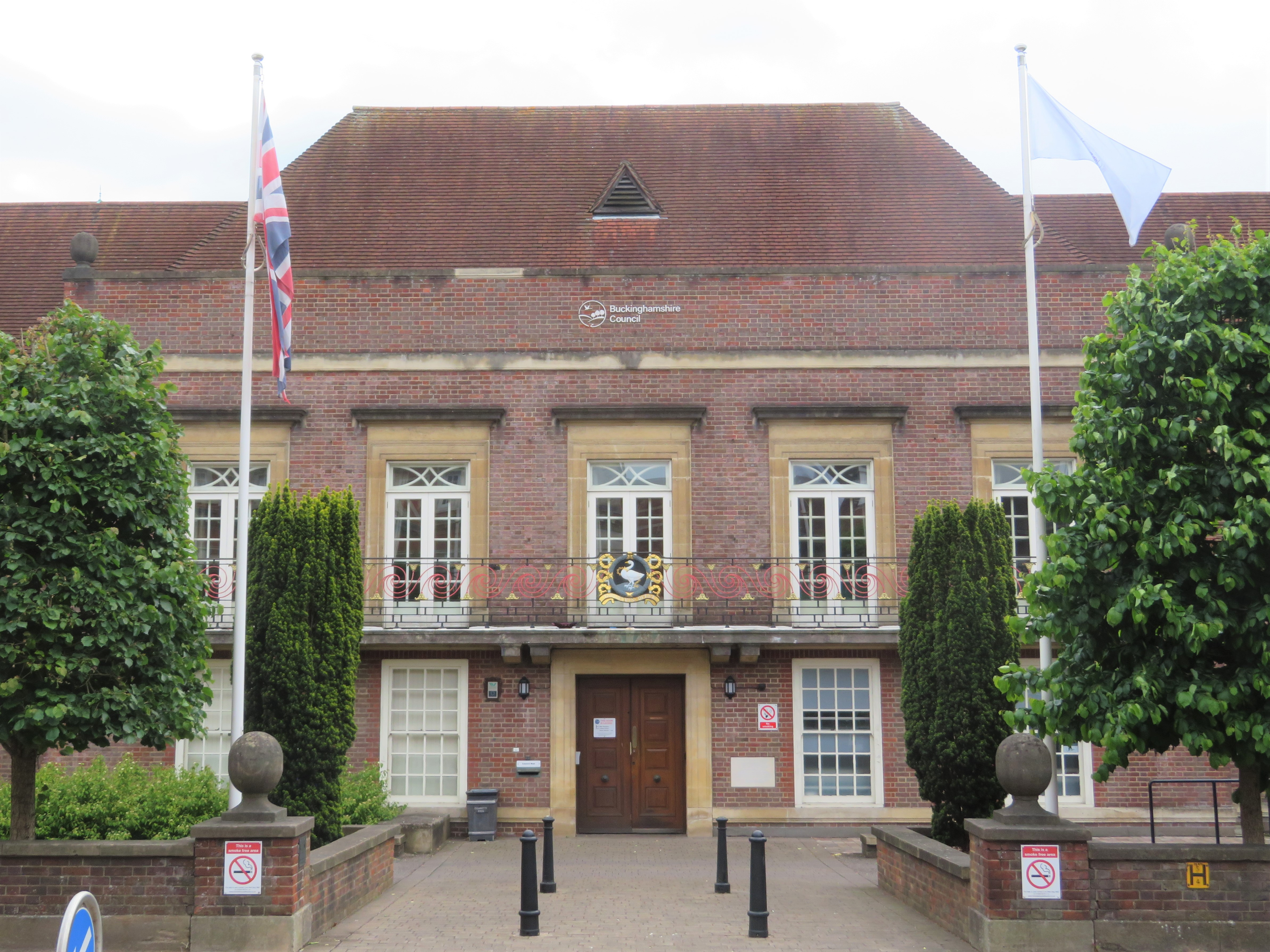
- Municipal Offices, Queen Victoria Road, High Wycombe: Council headquarters

- Wycombe shown within Buckinghamshire
- Sovereign state: United Kingdom
- Constituent country: England
- Region: South East England
- Non-metropolitan county: Buckinghamshire
- Status: Non-metropolitan district
- Admin HQ: High Wycombe
- Incorporated: 1 April 1974

Government
  - Type: Non-metropolitan district council
  - Body: Wycombe District Council
  - Leadership: Leader & Cabinet ( )

Area
  - Total: 125.32 sq mi (324.57 km^{2})

Population (2025)
  - Total: 174,143
  - Density: 1,389.6/sq mi (536.53/km^{2})
  - Ethnicity: 86.8% White; 7.9% S.Asian; 2.6% Black British; 1.8% Mixed Race
- Time zone: UTC0 (GMT)
  - Summer (DST): UTC+1 (BST)
- ONS code: 11UC (ONS); E07000007 (GSS)
- OS grid reference: SU867929
- Website: www.wycombe.gov.uk

Wycombe District /ˈwɪkəm/ was a local government district in Buckinghamshire in south-central England. Its council was based in the town of High Wycombe. The district was abolished on 31 March 2020 and its area is now administered by the unitary Buckinghamshire Council. It had introduced locality budgets before October 2013.

== History ==
The district's name was drawn from the Barony of Wycombe which was originally given to Thomas Gilbert, in 1171. The district was formed on 1 April 1974, under the Local Government Act 1972, by the merger of the Municipal Borough of High Wycombe with Marlow Urban District and Wycombe Rural District.

== Constituent parts ==
The Wycombe District Council area comprised:

Towns

- High Wycombe
- Princes Risborough
- Marlow

Civil parishes

There were 28 civil parishes including 2 where a Parish Meeting is held in lieu of a Parish Council.

== Sports clubs ==
High Wycombe is home to Wycombe Wanderers F.C.; within the district's boundaries are the homes of Marlow F.C., Marlow United F.C., Risborough Rangers F.C. and Marlow Rugby Union Football Club.

== Council affiliation ==
Wycombe District Council

Type
- Type: Non-Metropolitan District

Leadership
- Leader of the Council: Cllr Katrina Wood, Conservative
- Deputy Leader of the Council: Cllr Dominic Barnes, Conservative

Structure
- Seats: 60 seats
- Political groups: Administration Conservative (49) Other parties Labour (6) East Wycombe Independent Party (3) Liberal Democrats (1) Independent (1)
- Length of term: 4 years

Elections
- Last election: 7 May 2015
- Next election: 7 May 2021 (as part of Buckinghamshire Council)

Website
- www.wycombe.gov.uk

Following the local elections in May 2015, the council comprises the following:

Party	Number of councillors
Conservative	49
Labour	6
East Wycombe Independent Party	3
Liberal Democrats	1
Independent	1

== Transport ==
The district was bisected by the M40, with a major junction with the A404 at High Wycombe. The A404 connects Marlow and Wycombe within the district. The main railway line through the district, the Chiltern Main Line has major stations at High Wycombe and Princes Risborough. The Marlow Branch Line and Princes Risborough line also provide commuter services.
