= Saunderton =

Village in Buckinghamshire, England

Coordinates: 51.7°N 0.85°W

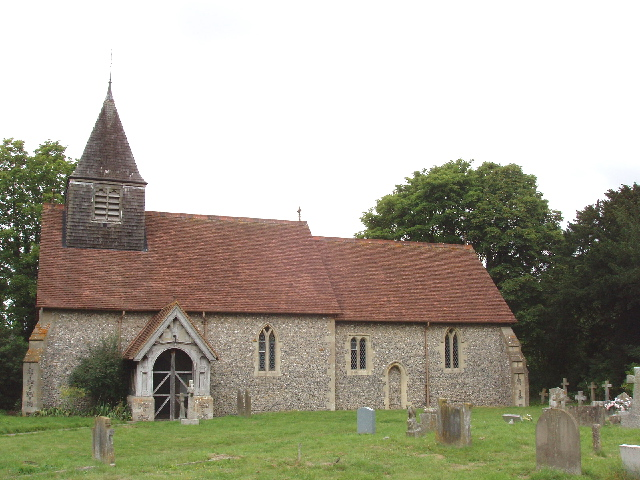
- SS Mary and Nicholas parish church

- Location within Buckinghamshire
- OS grid reference: SU8198
  - London: 33 mi (53 km)
- Civil parish: Bledlow-cum-Saunderton
- Unitary authority: Buckinghamshire
- Ceremonial county: Buckinghamshire
- Region: South East
- Country: England
- Sovereign state: United Kingdom
- Post town: Princes Risborough, High Wycombe
- Postcode district: HP27, HP14
- Dialling code: 01844, 01494
- Police: Thames Valley
- Fire: Buckinghamshire
- Ambulance: South Central
- UK Parliament: Mid Buckinghamshire constituency,
- Website: Bledlow-cum-Saunderton Parish Council

Saunderton is a village in the civil parish of Bledlow-cum-Saunderton in Buckinghamshire, England. It gives its name to the Saunderton Valley in the Chiltern Hills. It is 2 miles (3 km) south-west of Princes Risborough and 5 miles (8 km) north-west of High Wycombe. The parish includes Saunderton Lee, about 2 miles (3 km) south of the old village around the parish church, as well as a residential area on the A4010 road around Saunderton railway station on the Chiltern Main Line.

== History ==
The toponym "Saunderton" is derived from Old English, but its original meaning is not clear. The Domesday Book of 1086 records it as Santesdune, leading some scholars to believe that the village name derives from "saint's hill".

In 1835 Saunderton became part of the Wycombe poor law union, a group of parishes which collectively administered their functions under the poor laws. Although High Wycombe was the largest town in the union, the board of guardians decided to build the workhouse to serve the union at Saunderton. The workhouse was built in 1843. It was taken over for military use during the First World War, and was subsequently demolished sometime after the Second World War. It became one of the most secure houses in the region and regular absconders from other workhouses were often moved here because of its remote location. Inmates were taken to the workhouse by a constable.

Saunderton was an ancient parish. In 1934 the parish was abolished and its area became part of the new civil parish of Bledlow-cum-Saunderton. At the 1931 census (the last before the abolition of the parish), Saunderton had a population of 454.

== Parish church ==
The Church of England parish church of SS Mary and Nicholas was built in 1227 and originally dedicated solely to St Mary. But Saunderton had a second parish church, St Nicholas, that fell into decay. In 1452 St Nicholas' church was demolished, and St Mary's was given the double dedication to St Nicholas as well.

In 1886 the church's walls began to lean inwards, so the church was largely dismantled in 1888 and rebuilt over the next three years. Its 12th- or 13th-century font was reused and the 14th-century windows were restored and re-used. It is a Grade II* listed building.

The church has a small, timber-framed bell tower. It has three bells, all of which the bellfounder Alexander Rigby of Stamford, Lincolnshire cast in 1699. For technical reasons they are currently unringable.

SS Mary and Nicholas church is part of the parish of Bledlow with Saunderton and Horsenden, which in turn is part of the Benefice of Risborough.
