= Grade II* listed buildings in Wycombe =

There are over 20,000 Grade II* listed buildings in England. This page is a list of these buildings in the district of Wycombe in Buckinghamshire.

== List ==
Name	Location	Type	Completed (Note: The date given is the date used by Historic England as significant for the initial building or that of an important part in the structure's description.)	Date designated	Grid ref. (Note: Sometimes known as OSGB36, the grid reference is based on the British national grid reference system used by the Ordnance Survey.) Geo-coordinates	Entry number (Note: The "List Entry Number" is a unique number assigned to each listed building and scheduled monument by Historic England.)	Image
Church of St Mary	Saunderton, Bledlow-cum-Saunderton, Wycombe	Parish Church	14th century	21 June 1955	SP7955501890; 51°42′36″N 0°51′00″W	1332059	Church of St Mary More images
Forty Green Farmhouse	Forty Green, Bledlow-cum-Saunderton	Farmhouse	1718	21 June 1955	SP7662803312; 51°43′24″N 0°53′31″W	1332060	Upload Photo
Manor House	Bledlow, Bledlow-cum-Saunderton	House	c. 1670	21 June 1955	SP7796402132; 51°42′45″N 0°52′23″W	1125803	Upload Photo
The Old House Farmhouse	Bledlow-cum-Saunderton	Farmhouse	Late 15th century	21 June 1955	SP7905701896; 51°42′37″N 0°51′26″W	1310782	Upload Photo
Bradenham Manor	Bradenham	House	16th century	21 June 1955	SU8287797081; 51°39′59″N 0°48′11″W	1332048	Bradenham Manor More images
Church of St Botolph	Bradenham	Parish Church	c. 1100	21 June 1955	SU8283497126; 51°40′01″N 0°48′13″W	1125779	Church of St Botolph More images
The White House	Bradenham	House	c. 1800	21 June 1955	SU8269597132; 51°40′01″N 0°48′20″W	1310723	The White House More images
Church of St Peter and St Paul	Ellesborough	Parish Church	late C14-C15	21 June 1955	SP8363706739; 51°45′11″N 0°47′23″W	1125881	Church of St Peter and St Paul More images
Wellwick Manor	Ellesborough	House	17th century	25 October 1951	SP8523807884; 51°45′47″N 0°45′59″W	1118401	Wellwick Manor More images
Wellwick Manor	Wendover	House	17th century	25 October 1951	SP8523707886; 51°45′47″N 0°45′59″W	1332019	Wellwick Manor More images
Church of St Mary the Virgin	Fawley	Parish Church	12th century	21 June 1955	SU7535486716; 51°34′27″N 0°54′51″W	1125702	Church of St Mary the Virgin More images
Freeman Mausoleum	Fawley	Mausoleum	1750	7 February 1980	SU7531686718; 51°34′28″N 0°54′53″W	1125703	Freeman Mausoleum More images
Church of St Mary Magdalene	Great and Little Hampden	Parish Church	13th century	21 June 1955	SP8484502369; 51°42′49″N 0°46′24″W	1158762	Church of St Mary Magdalene More images
Widmere Farmhouse	Widmere, Great Marlow	Farmhouse	late C17-early 18th century	21 June 1955	SU8319889195; 51°35′44″N 0°48′01″W	1332119	Upload Photo
Church of St Mary	Hambleden	Parish Church	12th century	21 June 1955	SU7839986604; 51°34′22″N 0°52′13″W	1160018	Church of St Mary More images
Greenlands (part of Henley Business School)	Greenlands, Hambleden	Country House	c. 1810	4 December 1992	SU7757085483; 51°33′46″N 0°52′56″W	1125682	Greenlands (part of Henley Business School) More images
Hambleden Manor House	Hambleden	House	Early 17th century	21 June 1955	SU7851086651; 51°34′24″N 0°52′07″W	1125692	Hambleden Manor House More images
Kenricks	Hambleden	House	C19-C20	21 June 1955	SU7867886515; 51°34′19″N 0°51′58″W	1160069	Kenricks More images
Church of St Michael and All Angels	Hughenden Park, Hughenden	Parish Church	14th century	21 June 1955	SU8642195526; 51°39′07″N 0°45′08″W	1125743	Church of St Michael and All Angels More images
Church of St Nicholas	Ibstone	Parish Church	12th century	21 June 1955	SU7560292336; 51°37′29″N 0°54′33″W	1160705	Church of St Nicholas More images
Windmill	Lacey Green	Smock Mill	mid-late 17th century	26 April 1985	SP8191600781; 51°41′59″N 0°48′58″W	1159021	Windmill More images
Church of St John the Baptist	Little Marlow	Parish Church	Late 12th century	21 June 1955	SU8740787826; 51°34′57″N 0°44′24″W	1311079	Church of St John the Baptist More images
Bank Farmhouse	Meadle, Longwick-cum-Ilmer	House	15th century	26 April 1985	SP8068005980; 51°44′48″N 0°49′58″W	1159190	Upload Photo
Church of St Michael and All Angels	Horsenden, Longwick-cum-Ilmer	Parish Church	15th century	21 June 1955	SP7935502922; 51°43′10″N 0°51′10″W	1332032	Church of St Michael and All Angels More images
Church of St Peter	Ilmer, Longwick-cum-Ilmer	Parish Church	12th century	21 June 1955	SP7692205487; 51°44′34″N 0°53′14″W	1332033	Church of St Peter More images
Sir William Borlase's Grammar School	Marlow	School	1624	16 July 1949	SU8454286412; 51°34′13″N 0°46′54″W	1217598	Sir William Borlase's Grammar School More images
Brampton House	Marlow	House	18th century	16 July 1949	SU8502686320; 51°34′10″N 0°46′29″W	1332409	Brampton House More images
Church of All Saints	Marlow	Parish Church	1832-1835	16 July 1949	SU8513886173; 51°34′05″N 0°46′23″W	1332380	Church of All Saints More images
Court Garden	Marlow	Country House	18th century	31 January 1974	SU8488386148; 51°34′04″N 0°46′36″W	1125078	Court Garden More images
Crown Hotel	Marlow	Town Hall/Hotel/Shops	1807	16 July 1949	SU8483786614; 51°34′19″N 0°46′38″W	1159570	Crown Hotel More images
Old Parsonage	Marlow	House	14th century	16 July 1949	SU8515386368; 51°34′11″N 0°46′22″W	1125080	Old Parsonage More images
Remnantz	Marlow	House	1799-1811	16 July 1949	SU8462686402; 51°34′13″N 0°46′49″W	1275651	Remnantz More images
The Stables at Remnantz	Marlow	Gate Pier		16 July 1949	SU8466386382; 51°34′12″N 0°46′47″W	1275653	The Stables at Remnantz
The End House	Marlow	House	Late 18th century	16 July 1949	SU8503286310; 51°34′09″N 0°46′28″W	1125072	The End House More images
The Old House	Marlow	House	18th century	16 July 1949	SU8479586509; 51°34′16″N 0°46′40″W	1235001	The Old House More images
The Old Malt House	Marlow	House	Late 18th century	16 July 1949	SU8518386234; 51°34′07″N 0°46′21″W	1275958	Upload Photo
The White House	Marlow	House	c. 1730	16 July 1949	SU8496886411; 51°34′13″N 0°46′32″W	1159481	The White House More images
Western House	Marlow	House	1699	16 July 1949	SU8447786355; 51°34′11″N 0°46′57″W	1216983	Upload Photo
29 and 31 West Street	Marlow	House	18th century	16 July 1949	SU8478686501; 51°34′16″N 0°46′41″W	1235047	29 and 31 West Street
33 West Street	Marlow	House	18th century	16 July 1949	SU8478186487; 51°34′15″N 0°46′41″W	1275805	Upload Photo
47 West Street	Marlow	House	18th century	16 July 1949	SU8473986462; 51°34′14″N 0°46′43″W	1216789	Upload Photo
41 and 41a High Street	Marlow	House	18th century	17 August 1970	SU8496686471; 51°34′15″N 0°46′32″W	1332404	41 and 41a High Street More images
74 and 76 High Street	Marlow	House	Mid 18th century	16 July 1949	SU8498086393; 51°34′12″N 0°46′31″W	1332408	74 and 76 High Street More images
Church of St Peter and St Paul	Medmenham	Parish Church	Mid 12th century	21 June 1955	SU8047484472; 51°33′12″N 0°50′27″W	1310930	Church of St Peter and St Paul More images
Danesfield House	Danesfield, Medmenham	Country House	1899-1901	9 August 1977	SU8163084394; 51°33′09″N 0°49′27″W	1310810	Danesfield House More images
Lodge Farmhouse	Medmenham	Farmhouse	17th century	21 June 1955	SU8042384622; 51°33′17″N 0°50′29″W	1125591	Upload Photo
Medmenham Abbey, Abbey House and Wall with Arch to Forecourt	Medmenham	Abbey	1987	21 June 1955	SU8068183826; 51°32′51″N 0°50′16″W	1310928	Upload Photo
Wittingdon	Wittington, Medmenham	Country House	1898	24 November 1976	SU8209584414; 51°33′10″N 0°49′02″W	1125557	Wittingdon More images
Chipps Manor	Wheeler End, Piddington and Wheeler End	Farmhouse	1733	21 June 1955	SU8032293738; 51°38′12″N 0°50′27″W	1332101	Upload Photo
Church of St Mary	Princes Risborough	Parish Church	13th century	21 June 1955	SP8059703492; 51°43′28″N 0°50′04″W	1125815	Church of St Mary More images
Dovecote West of St Dunstan's Church	Monks Risborough, Princes Risborough	Dovecote	16th century	21 June 1955	SP8119204442; 51°43′58″N 0°49′33″W	1125788	Dovecote West of St Dunstan's Church More images
Manor House and attached Garden Walls (north West Wall incorporated into the Forge and the Coach House)	Princes Risborough, Wycombe	House	1955	21 June 1955	SP8061603536; 51°43′29″N 0°50′03″W	1311048	Manor House and attached Garden Walls (north West Wall incorporated into the Forge and the Coach House) More images
Market House	Princes Risborough	Market House	1824	21 June 1955	SP8074203502; 51°43′28″N 0°49′57″W	1159718	Market House More images
Church of St Peter and St Paul	Stokenchurch	Parish Church	12th century	21 June 1955	SU7602996436; 51°39′42″N 0°54′08″W	1310455	Church of St Peter and St Paul More images
Church of St Mary	Turville	Parish Church	12th century	21 June 1955	SU7670191153; 51°36′50″N 0°53′37″W	1125644	Church of St Mary More images
Northend Farmhouse	Turville	Farmhouse	c. 1700	21 June 1955	SU7344792744; 51°37′43″N 0°56′25″W	1125674	Upload Photo
The Old Vicarage	Turville	House	c. 1967	21 June 1955	SU7665491165; 51°36′51″N 0°53′40″W	1125643	The Old Vicarage More images
Daphne's Temple, West Wycombe Park	West Wycombe	Temple	18th century	9 January 1954	SU8329994644; 51°38′40″N 0°47′51″W	1160546	Daphne's Temple, West Wycombe Park More images
Flora's Temple, West Wycombe Park	West Wycombe	Loggia	Late 18th century	9 January 1954	SU8380494329; 51°38′30″N 0°47′25″W	1125121	Upload Photo
Island Temple, West Wycombe Park	West Wycombe	Loggia	1778-1780	9 January 1954	SU8316294451; 51°38′34″N 0°47′58″W	1125125	Island Temple, West Wycombe Park More images
North Lodge, West Wycombe Park	West Wycombe	Lodge	18th century	9 January 1954	SU8333894641; 51°38′40″N 0°47′49″W	1125126	North Lodge, West Wycombe Park
North West Lodge and Gatepiers, West Wycombe Park	West Wycombe	Gate Pier	18th century	9 January 1954	SU8277294647; 51°38′40″N 0°48′19″W	1125127	Upload Photo
Sawmill House	West Wycombe	House	Late 18th century	9 January 1954	SU8373694141; 51°38′23″N 0°47′29″W	1332394	Upload Photo
Small Temple, West Wycombe Park	West Wycombe	Dovecote	Later	9 January 1954	SU8284494261; 51°38′28″N 0°48′15″W	1125124	Small Temple, West Wycombe Park More images
Temple of Bacchus, West Wycombe Park	West Wycombe	Statue	18th century	28 June 1973	SU8288594302; 51°38′29″N 0°48′13″W	1125084	Upload Photo
Temple of the Four Winds, West Wycombe Park	West Wycombe	Temple	18th century	9 January 1954	SU8318894170; 51°38′25″N 0°47′57″W	1160544	Temple of the Four Winds, West Wycombe Park More images
The Exedra, West Wycombe Park	West Wycombe	Wall	Late 18th century	28 June 1973	SU8289294288; 51°38′29″N 0°48′13″W	1125083	The Exedra, West Wycombe Park More images
Triumphal (Cockpit) Arch, West Wycombe Park	West Wycombe	Arch	Late 18th century	28 June 1973	SU8290094288; 51°38′29″N 0°48′12″W	1160549	Triumphal (Cockpit) Arch, West Wycombe Park
The (Hellfire) Cave	West Wycombe	Cave	1750-1752	9 January 1954	SU8294294812; 51°38′46″N 0°48′10″W	1332393	The (Hellfire) Cave More images
The Church Loft	West Wycombe	Guest House	Early 18th century	9 January 1954	SU8301594675; 51°38′41″N 0°48′06″W	1125134	The Church Loft More images
The Dower House	West Wycombe	House	c. 1763	9 January 1954	SU8302794698; 51°38′42″N 0°48′05″W	1160483	Upload Photo
The Manor House	West Wycombe	House	Early 18th century	9 January 1954	SU8298794675; 51°38′41″N 0°48′07″W	1125135	Upload Photo
Workshop (furniture Factory) adjoining No 37 High Street on North and occupied by EMF Brown	West Wycombe	Furniture Factory	Late 18th century or early 19th century	9 January 1954	SU8302194686; 51°38′41″N 0°48′06″W	1125174	Upload Photo
Church of St Paul	Wooburn	Parish Church	Late 12th century	21 June 1955	SU9095387795; 51°34′54″N 0°41′19″W	1125542	Church of St Paul More images
Clapton Revel	Wooburn	House	c1700-1710	17 October 1969	SU9100290035; 51°36′07″N 0°41′15″W	1125541	Upload Photo
Cores End Cottage, Cores End House	Wooburn	House	c. 1730	21 June 1955	SU9041987249; 51°34′37″N 0°41′48″W	1160086	Upload Photo
Bassetsbury Manor	Wycombe	Manor House	Late 17th century or early 18th century	9 January 1954	SU8765492378; 51°37′24″N 0°44′07″W	1310947	Bassetsbury Manor More images
Church of Saint Francis	Wycombe	Church	1929-1930	28 June 1973	SU8771994485; 51°38′32″N 0°44′01″W	1125114	Church of Saint Francis More images
Disraeli Monument	Wycombe	Wall	1862	28 June 1973	SU8565594619; 51°38′38″N 0°45′49″W	1125201	Disraeli Monument More images
Hughenden Manor Farmhouse	Wycombe	Farmhouse	Late 17th century or early 18th century	9 January 1954	SU8575395117; 51°38′54″N 0°45′43″W	1125184	Upload Photo
Premises occupied by Midland Bank	Wycombe	Bank (financial)	18th century	9 January 1954	SU8653992996; 51°37′45″N 0°45′04″W	1125187	Upload Photo
The Little Market House	Wycombe	Market House	c. 1604	9 January 1954	SU8655693031; 51°37′46″N 0°45′03″W	1310836	The Little Market House More images
Wycombe Abbey (parts of Wycombe Abbey School)	Wycombe	Manor House	17th century	9 January 1954	SU8658192627; 51°37′33″N 0°45′02″W	1310649	Upload Photo
7 Castle Street	Wycombe	House	18th century	28 June 1973	SU8656293129; 51°37′49″N 0°45′03″W	1159695	Upload Photo
30 High Street	Wycombe	House	18th century	9 January 1954	SU8666792924; 51°37′42″N 0°44′58″W	1159966	Upload Photo
33 High Street	Wycombe	House	18th century	9 January 1954	SU8664292942; 51°37′43″N 0°44′59″W	1332337	Upload Photo
34 High Street	Wycombe	House	18th century or earlier	28 June 1973	SU8662492942; 51°37′43″N 0°45′00″W	1125162	Upload Photo
39 High Street	Wycombe	Town House	1st half of 18th century	9 January 1954	SU8657192981; 51°37′44″N 0°45′02″W	1125163	Upload Photo
