= Remnantz =

Coordinates: 51.570148°N 0.780363°W

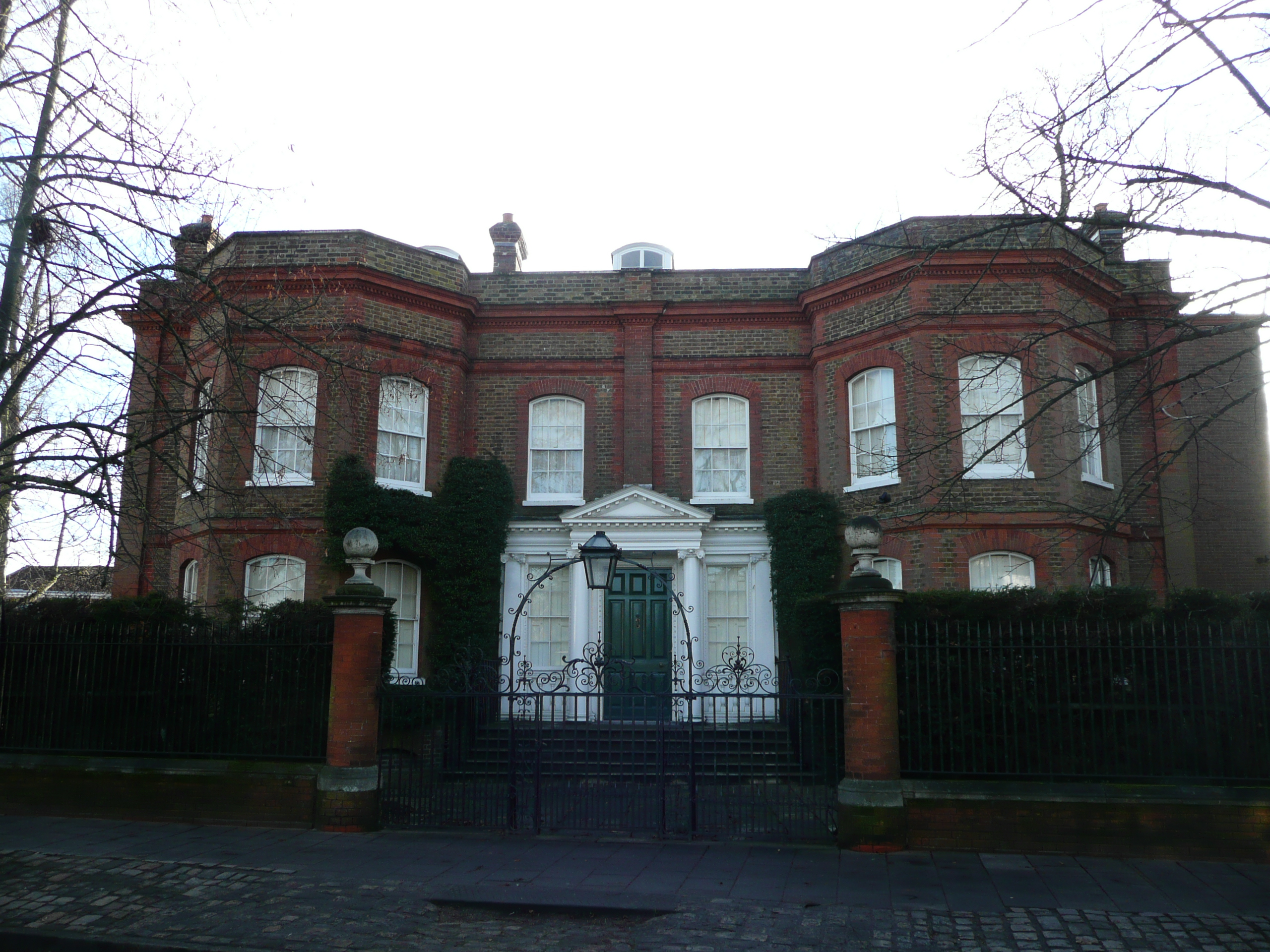
Remnantz (the main house) in 2011

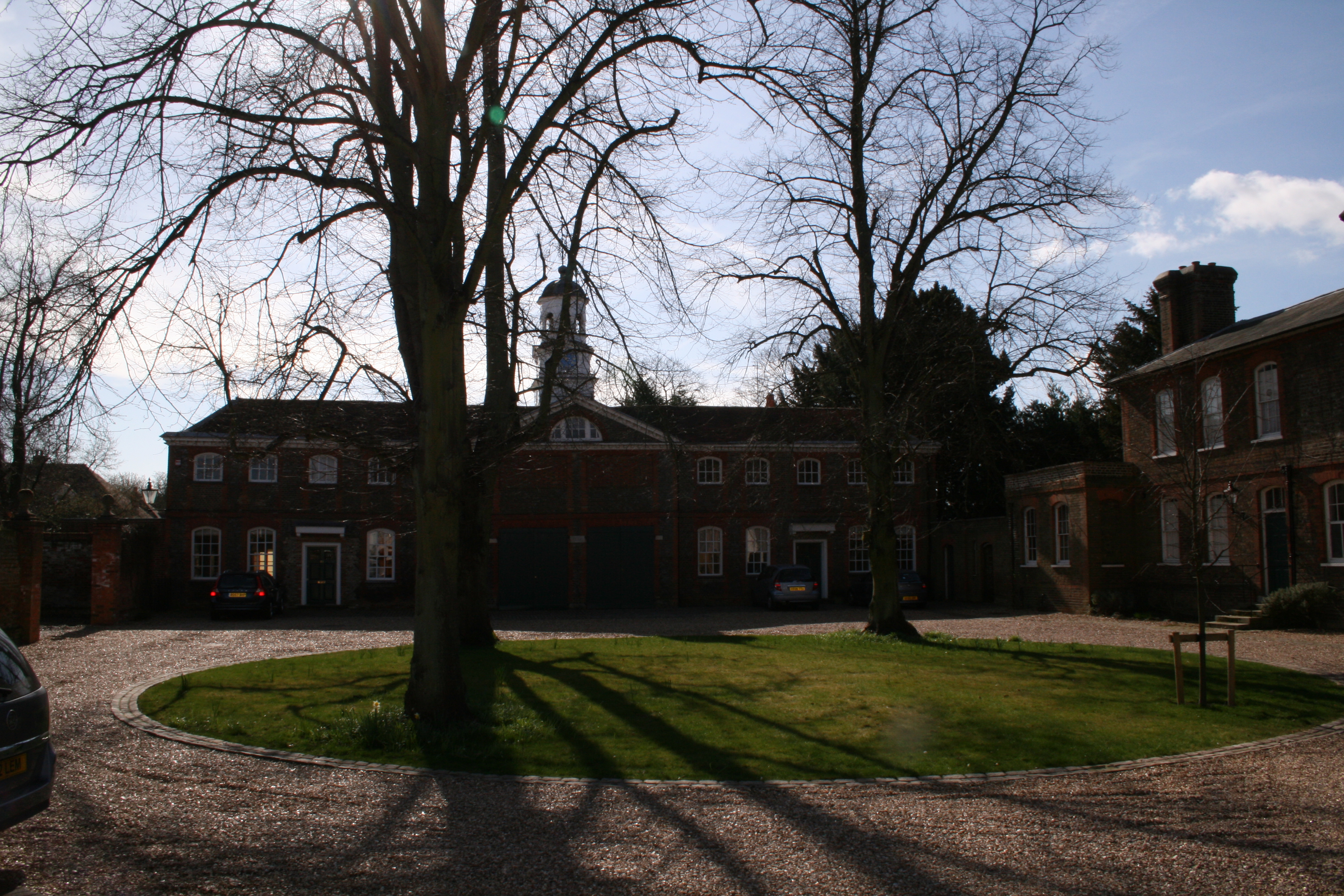
The stable block at Remnantz in 2009

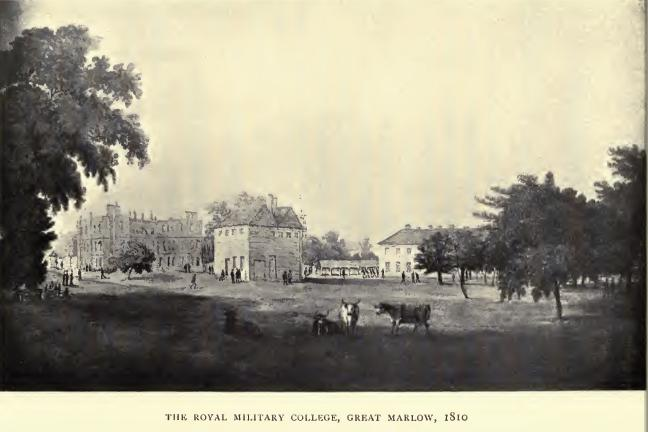
As the Royal Military College in 1810

Remnantz is a country house in Marlow in Buckinghamshire. It is listed Grade II* on the National Heritage List for England.

== History ==
The main house was built around 1720.

In 1799, Colonel John Le Marchant established the Royal Military College, High Wycombe, a school for staff officers. In 1801, Parliament voted a grant of £30,000 for more ambitious proposals, and in 1801 the school for staff officers at High Wycombe became the Senior Department of a new Military College. In 1802, now the first Lieutenant Governor of the College, Le Marchant opened its Junior Department at Remnantz in West Street, Great Marlow. A stable block, just to the south-east of the main house, was built around that time. In 1811, the College moved to Sandhurst as the Junior Department of the Royal Military College.

The house was acquired by Thomas Wethered, a brewer, in the first half of the 19th century and it was occupied by Lieutenant Commander Owen Wethered, High Sheriff of Buckinghamshire, in the 1960s. The family business was Thomas Wethered & Sons Ltd, a brewery which operated in Marlow from 1758 until it closed in 1988. Remnantz has been owned by the Bosley family since 2007.
