= Marlow, Buckinghamshire =

Town in Buckinghamshire, England

Coordinates: 51.570°N 0.780°W

Marlow
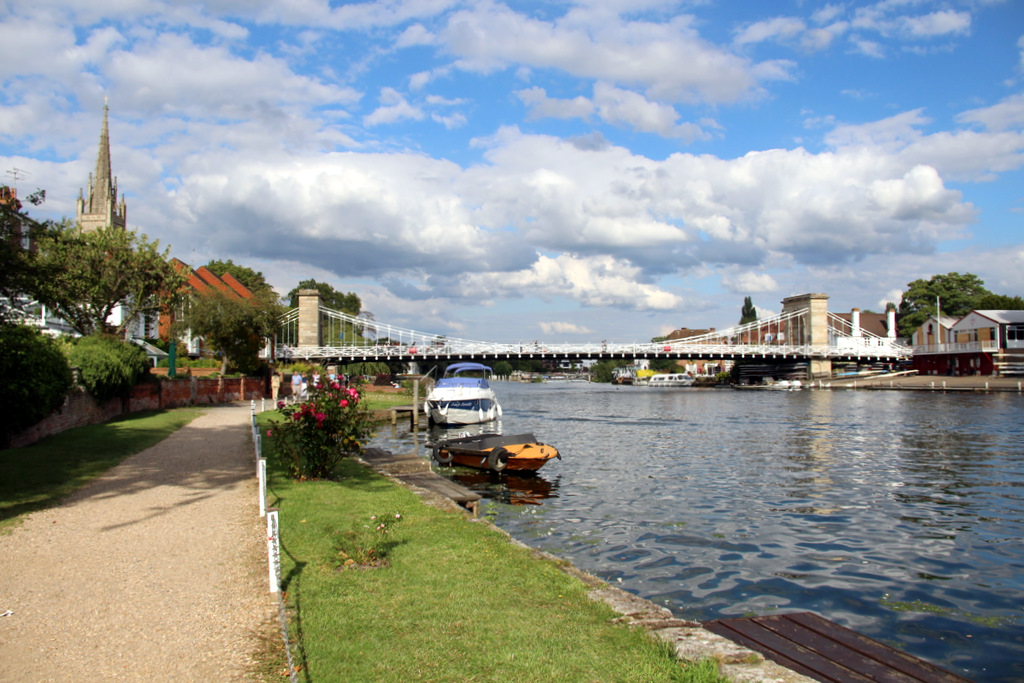
- Overlooking the River Thames and Marlow

- Location within Buckinghamshire
- Population: 14,004 (2011 Census); 14,325 (2011 Census)
- OS grid reference: SU855865
- Civil parish: Marlow
- Unitary authority: Buckinghamshire
- Ceremonial county: Buckinghamshire
- Region: South East
- Country: England
- Sovereign state: United Kingdom
- Post town: MARLOW
- Postcode district: SL7
- Dialling code: 01628
- Police: Thames Valley
- Fire: Buckinghamshire
- Ambulance: South Central
- UK Parliament: Beaconsfield
- Website: www.marlow-tc.gov.uk

Marlow (/ˈmɑːrloʊ/ MAR-loh) is a town and civil parish on the River Thames in Buckinghamshire, England, 4 miles (6 km) southwest of High Wycombe, 5 miles (8 km) northwest of Maidenhead and 33 miles (53 km) west of central London.

== Name ==
The name is recorded in 1015 as Mere lafan, meaning "Land left after the draining of a pond" in Old English.

From Norman times the manor, parish, and later borough were formally known as Great Marlow, distinguishing them from Little Marlow (which lies to the east). The ancient parish was large, including rural areas north and west of the town. In 1896 the civil parish of Great Marlow was divided into Great Marlow Urban District (the town) and Great Marlow civil parish (the rural areas). In 1897 the urban district was renamed Marlow Urban District, and the town has been known simply as Marlow. In the rural area of Great Marlow, the village of Marlow Bottom, immediately north of the town, was created as a separate parish in 2007. In practical terms, the parishes of Marlow, Marlow Bottom, Great Marlow and Little Marlow (with a combined population of 20,833 in 2024) operate as a single community.

== History ==
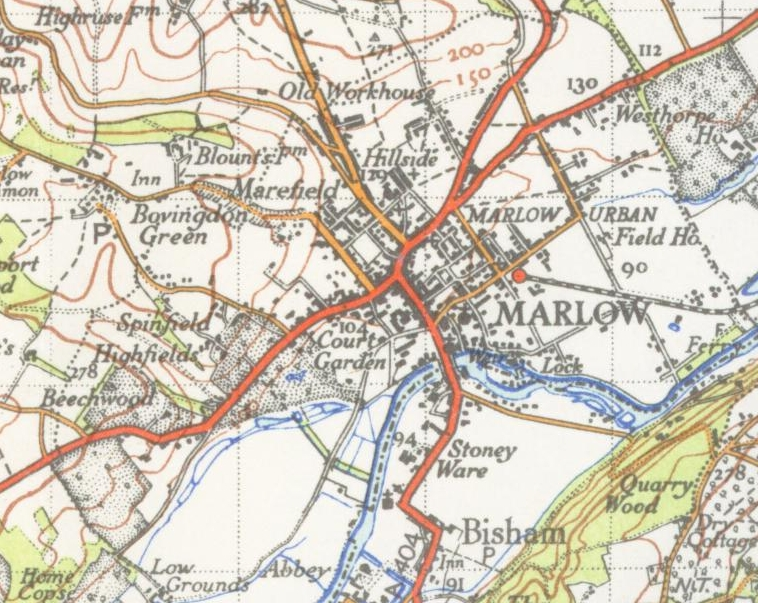
A map of Marlow from 1945

Marlow is recorded in the Domesday Book as Merlaue.

Magna Britannia includes the following entry for Marlow: "The manor of Marlow, which had belonged to the Earls of Mercia, was given by William the Conqueror, to his Queen Matilda. Henry the First, bestowed it on his natural son, Robert de Melhent, afterwards Earl of Gloucester, from whom it passed, with that title, to the Clares and Despencers, and from the latter, by female heirs, to the Beauchamps and Nevilles, Earls of Warwick. It continued in the crown from the time of Richard III's marriage with Anne Neville, until Queen Mary granted it to William Lord Paget, in whose family it continued more than a century; after which, it passed, by purchase, to Sir Humphrey Winch, in 1670; to Lord Falkland in 1686; to Sir James Etheridge in 1690; to Sir John Guise in 1718; and to Sir William Clayton in 1736. It is now the property of Sir William Clayton bart. a descendant of the last purchaser".

Marlow owed its importance to its location on the River Thames, where the road from Reading to High Wycombe crosses the river. It had its own market by 1227 (hence the name Chipping Marlow), although the market lapsed before 1600. Marlow's status as a regional commercial centre was present even before the first bridge in this area was built in the 13th century due to the settlement acting as an inland port.

A 14th-century hall, known as 'The Old Parsonage', in Marlow on St Peters Street, is currently the oldest inhabited building in Buckinghamshire.

From 1301 to 1307, the town had its own Member of Parliament, and it returned two members from 1624 to 1867.

The population of Great Marlow was 4,480 by 1841.

From 1897 to 1906 potter Conrad Dressler operated the Medmenham Pottery at Marlow Common.

== Geography ==
Marlow is adjoined by Marlow Bottom, a mile to the north. Little Marlow is nearby to the east along the A4155 Little Marlow Road and Bourne End is further along the same road. To the south across the Thames are Bisham (home of Bisham Abbey) and Cookham Dean, both in Berkshire.

== Landmarks ==
There has been a Marlow Bridge over the Thames since the reign of King Edward III. The current bridge is a suspension bridge, designed by William Tierney Clark in 1832, and it was constructed by 1835. It was a prototype for and is twinned with the much larger Széchenyi Chain Bridge across the River Danube in Budapest.

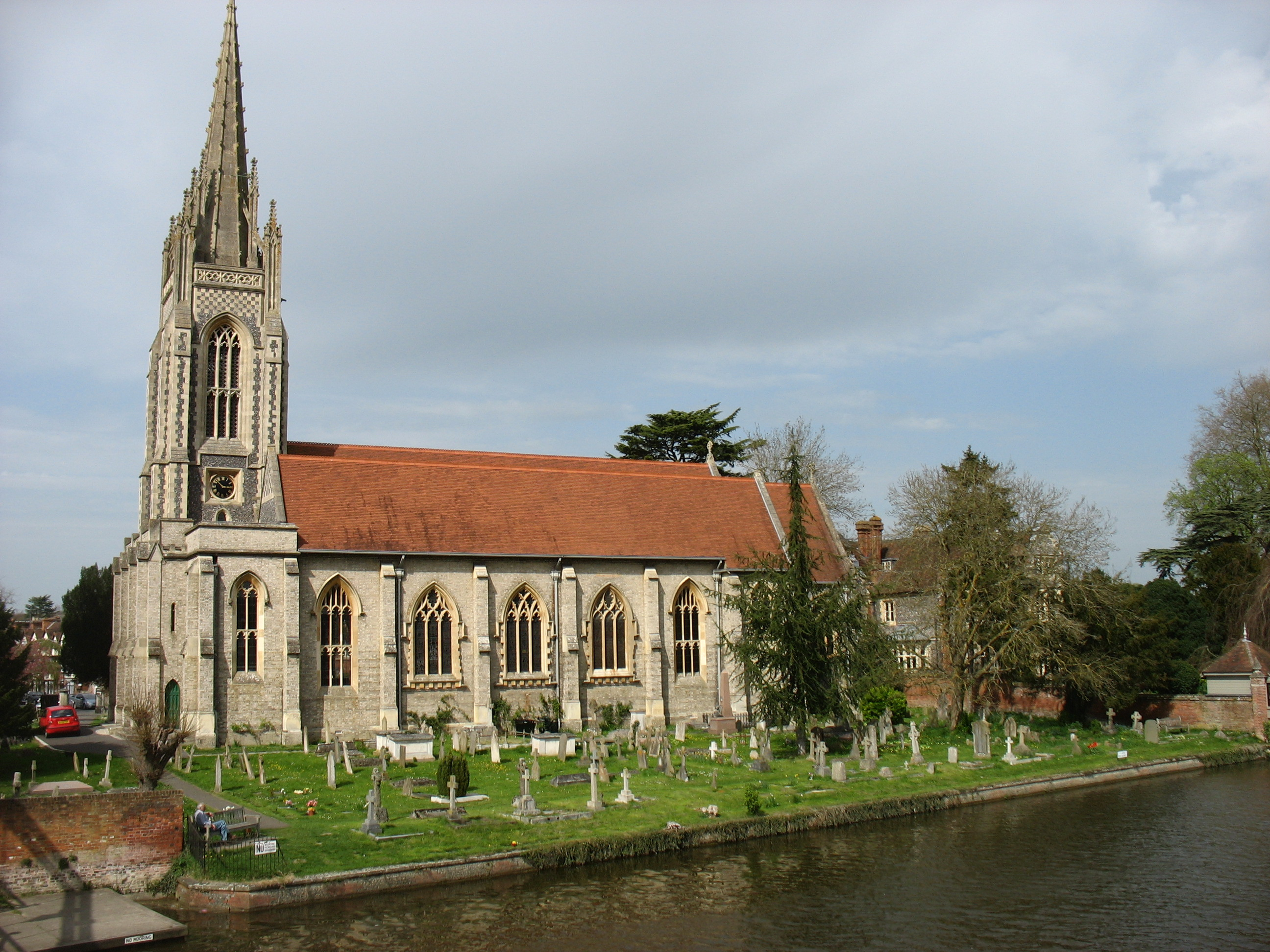
All Saints Church, Marlow

Next to the bridge along the river is All Saints Church, in the centre of the town, at the bottom of the High Street. The present building was constructed in the Victorian era, as the spire of the previous Norman church collapsed in 1831. The new church is built of Bath stone, with a spire reaching 170 feet (52 m). The church was completed in 1835, and was designed by Charles Frederick Inwood. Some stone monuments and statues were saved from the previous medieval church.

A memorial to Charles Frohman is located on The Causeway. The memorial, by the artist Leonard Stanford Merrifield, features a drinking fountain with a sculptured nymph and inscription.

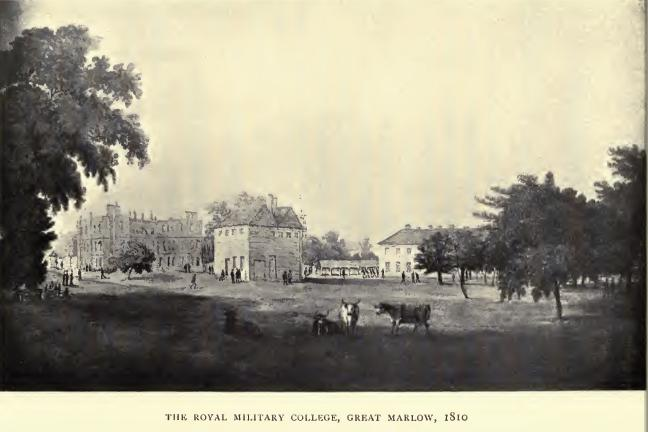
Royal Military College, Marlow, Buckinghamshire, 1810

The Junior Wing of the Royal Military College, which is now based at Sandhurst, was once based at Remnantz, a large house in West Street, built in the early 18th century.

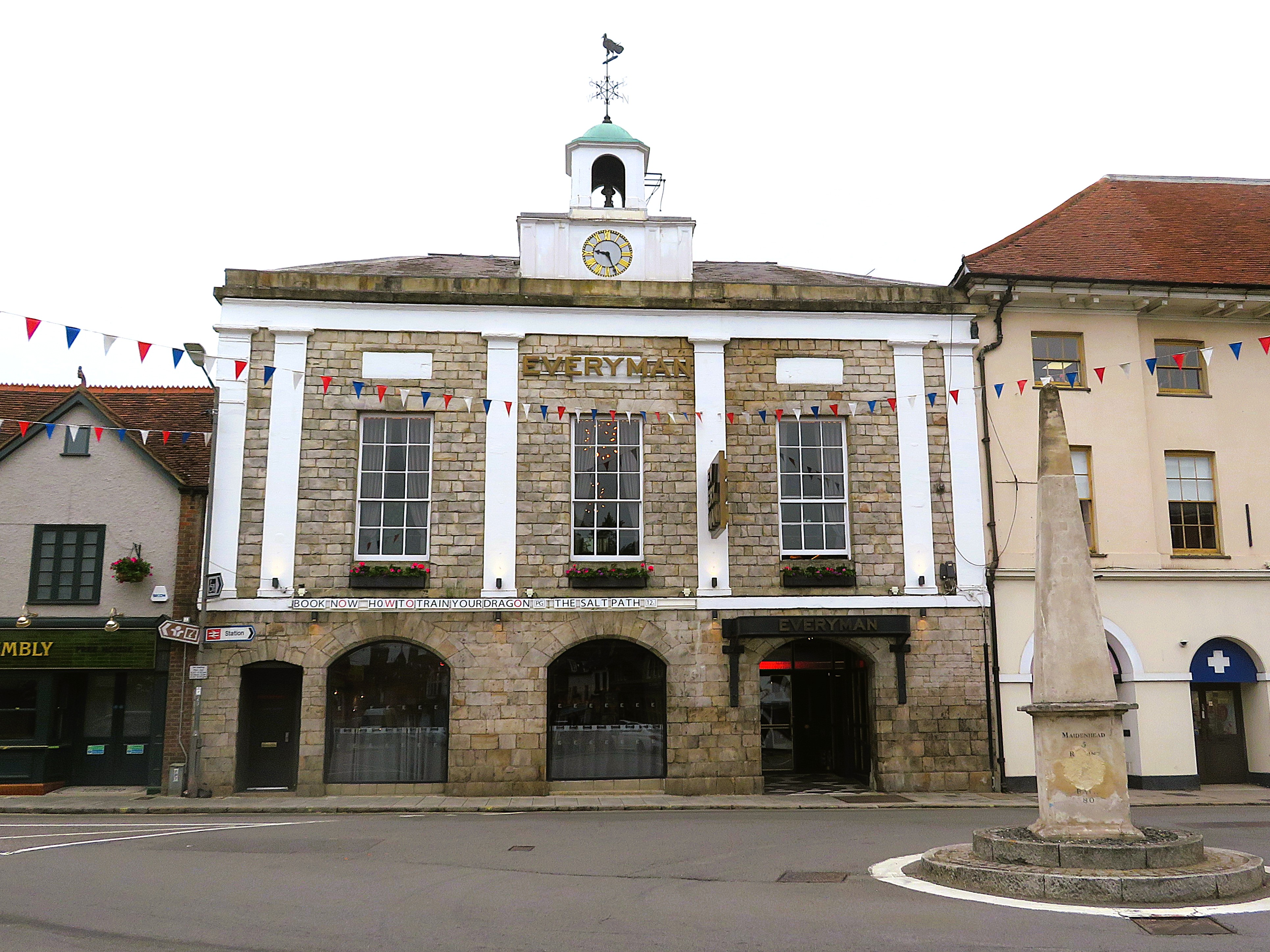
The former Marlow Town Hall, now the Everyman Cinema

Marlow Town Hall was completed in 1807. It was subsequently converted into a hotel, then a shop and now a cinema.

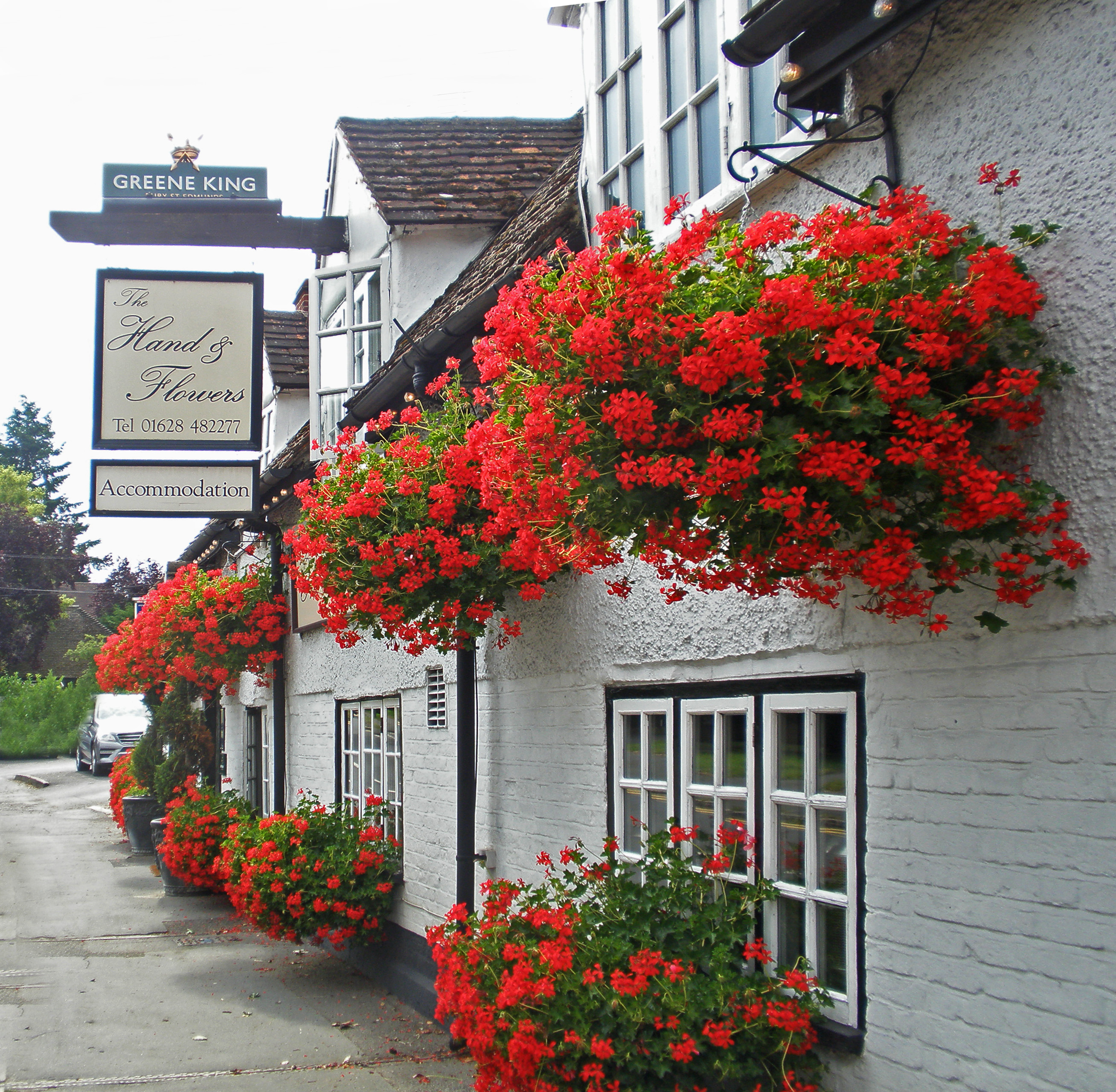
The Hand & Flowers has earned 2 Michelin stars

The Hand & Flowers, the first gastropub to hold two Michelin stars, is located on West Street. It is one of several local pubs serving award-winning beers brewed locally, in Marlow Bottom, by the Rebellion Beer Company.

Marlow is the location of Marlow Lock, originating from the 14th century.

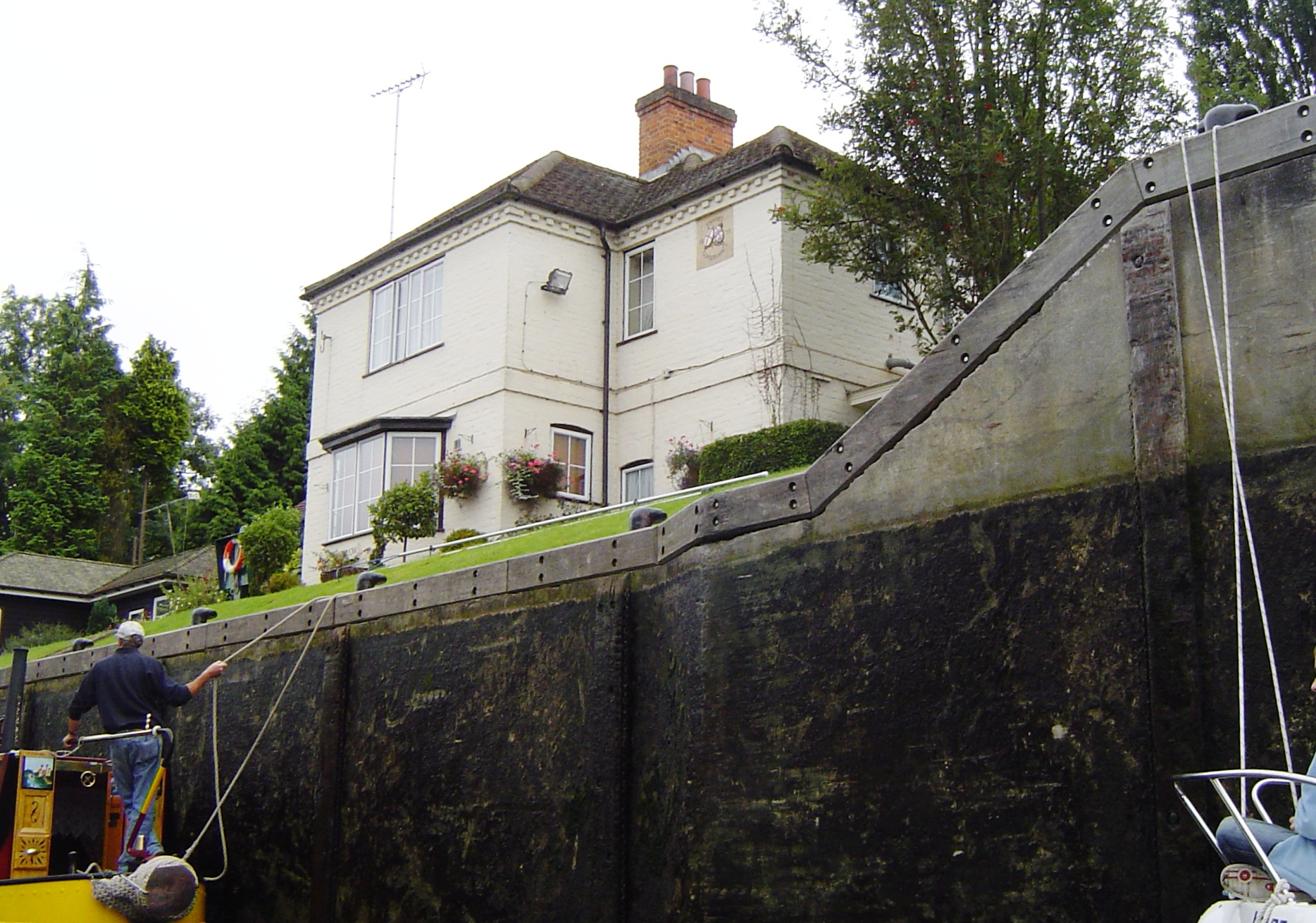
Marlow Lock house from the depths of the lock

== Twinning ==
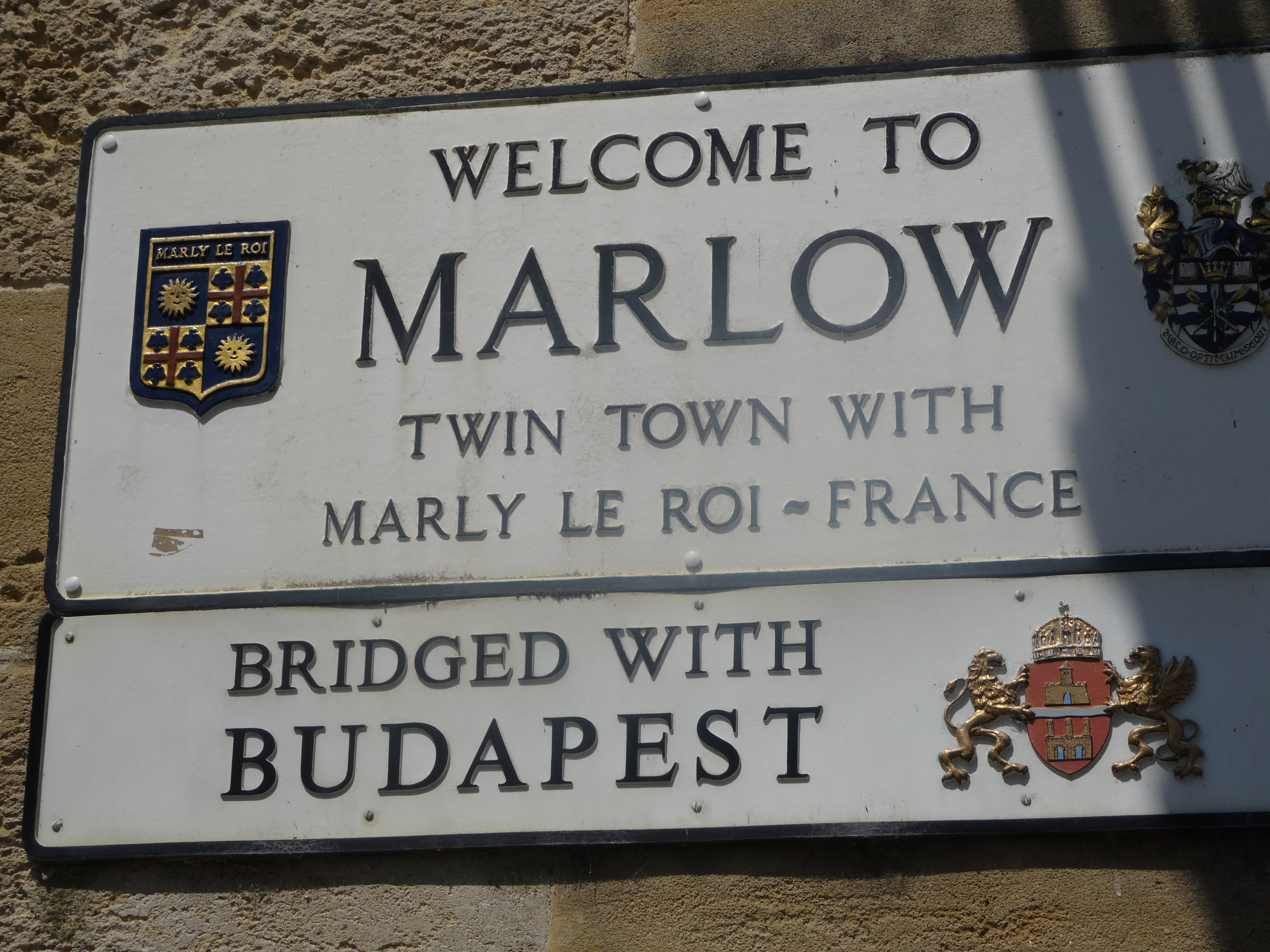
Sign on the bridge to Marlow

Marlow is twinned with

- Marly-le-Roi, France, since 1980.
- Budavár, a district of Budapest, Hungary.

== Transport ==
The A4155 road runs through Marlow town centre, with the A404 lying one mile to the east, the M40 motorway further to the north, and the M4 motorway to the south.

Marlow is served by a railway station which is the terminus of a single-track branch line from Maidenhead. The train service is known as the Marlow Donkey, which was the nickname given to the steam locomotives that once operated on the line. There is also a pub with the same name, located close to the railway station.

Bus services are provided by Arriva Shires & Essex to neighbouring towns, including High Wycombe, Henley-on-Thames and Reading. In July 2024, Carousel Buses took over the bus services, after Arriva closed its High Wycombe depot.

Cycling infrastructure is currently limited to a small number of shared use cycle paths. However, local charity Transition Town Marlow are campaigning to improve this by allowing cyclists to use footpaths as pedestrian priority; improving and increasing the amount of shared use paths and installing more cycle racks.

== Education ==
Education is provided by several schools, including:

- Great Marlow School (11–18)
- Sir William Borlase's Grammar School (11–18)
- Burford School (4–11)
- Danesfield School (4–11)
- Foxes Piece School (4–11)
- Holy Trinity Church of England School (7–11)
- Marlow Church of England Infant School (4–7)
- Spinfield School (4–11)
- St Peter's Catholic Primary School (4–11)

== Governance ==
There are two tiers of local government covering Marlow, at parish (town) and unitary authority level: Marlow Town Council, and Buckinghamshire Council.

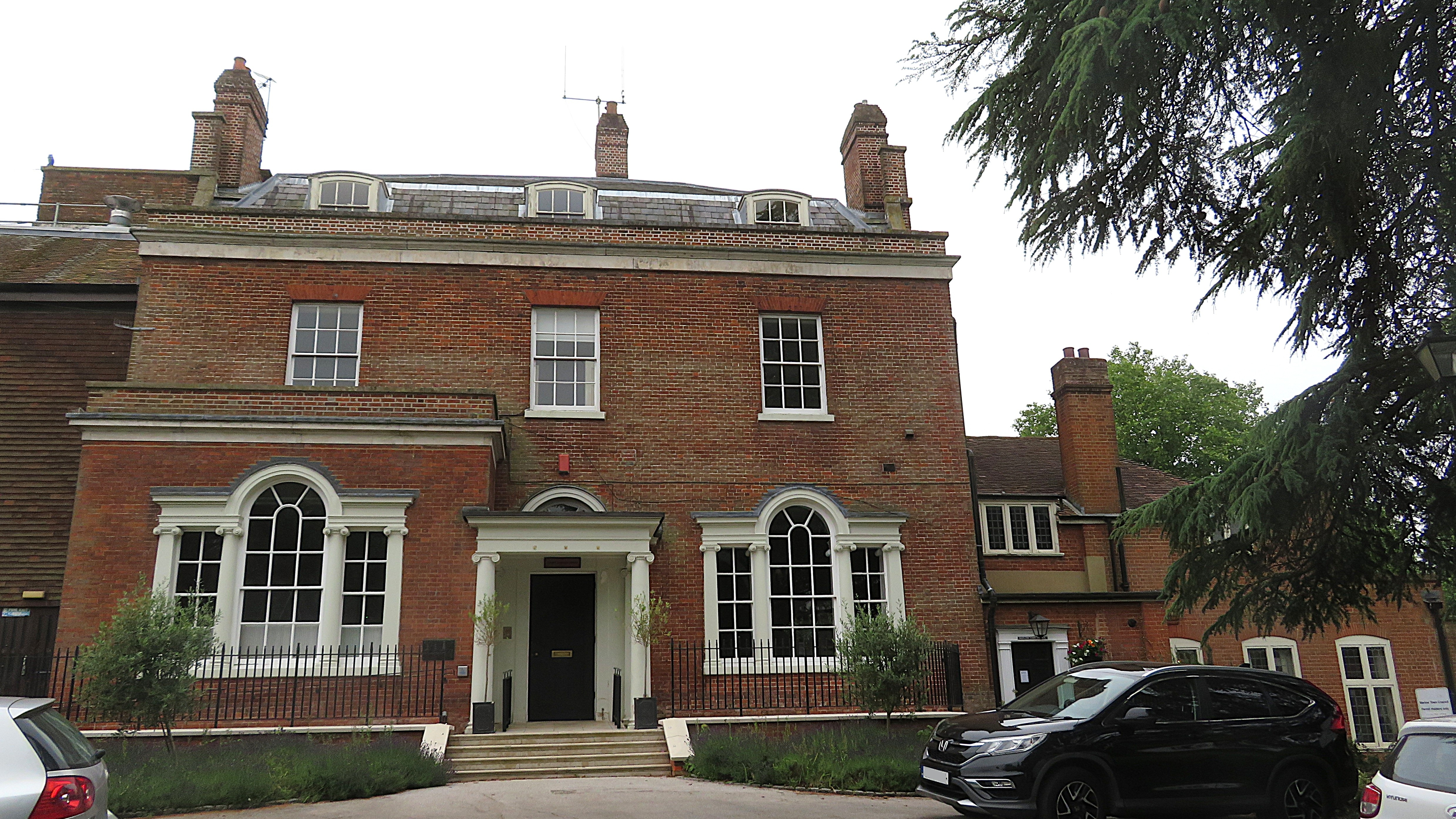
Court Garden, Pound Lane: Council offices since 1934.

Marlow Town Council was established in 1974 as a successor parish to the former Marlow Urban District Council, which had been created in 1896. The urban district council had been based at Court Garden House since 1934, and the town council continues to be based there. Between 1974 and 2020 the town was also included in the Wycombe District, based in High Wycombe. The county and district councils merged in 2020 to become the unitary Buckinghamshire Council.

Marlow is divided into three wards for electing town councillors: North & West, South and South East. There are a total of twelve Marlow Town Councillors elected from these wards. The wards have seven, two and three seats respectively. Between 2011 and 2025, the Town Council was entirely Conservative, with several councillors "double-hatting" across town and county council. The town forms a single ward (including Marlow Bottom) with three councillors, for electing members to Buckinghamshire Council.

In the 2021 local elections, a group of independent candidates contested eleven out of the twelve seats. They worked under the banner "Independents for Marlow" and were inspired by similar actions in Frome, High Wycombe, and other places, part of the "flatpack democracy" movement. None were successful and all twelve seats were held by Conservatives.

In the 2025 local elections 7 independent candidates (6 of which were grouped under "Residents for Marlow") were elected to the Town Council, with the remaining seats going to 1 Liberal Democrat and 4 Conservatives. For the Buckinghamshire Council elections, the constituency also included Marlow Bottom, with the 3 elected councillors including 1 Liberal Democrat and 2 Conservatives.

== Sport ==
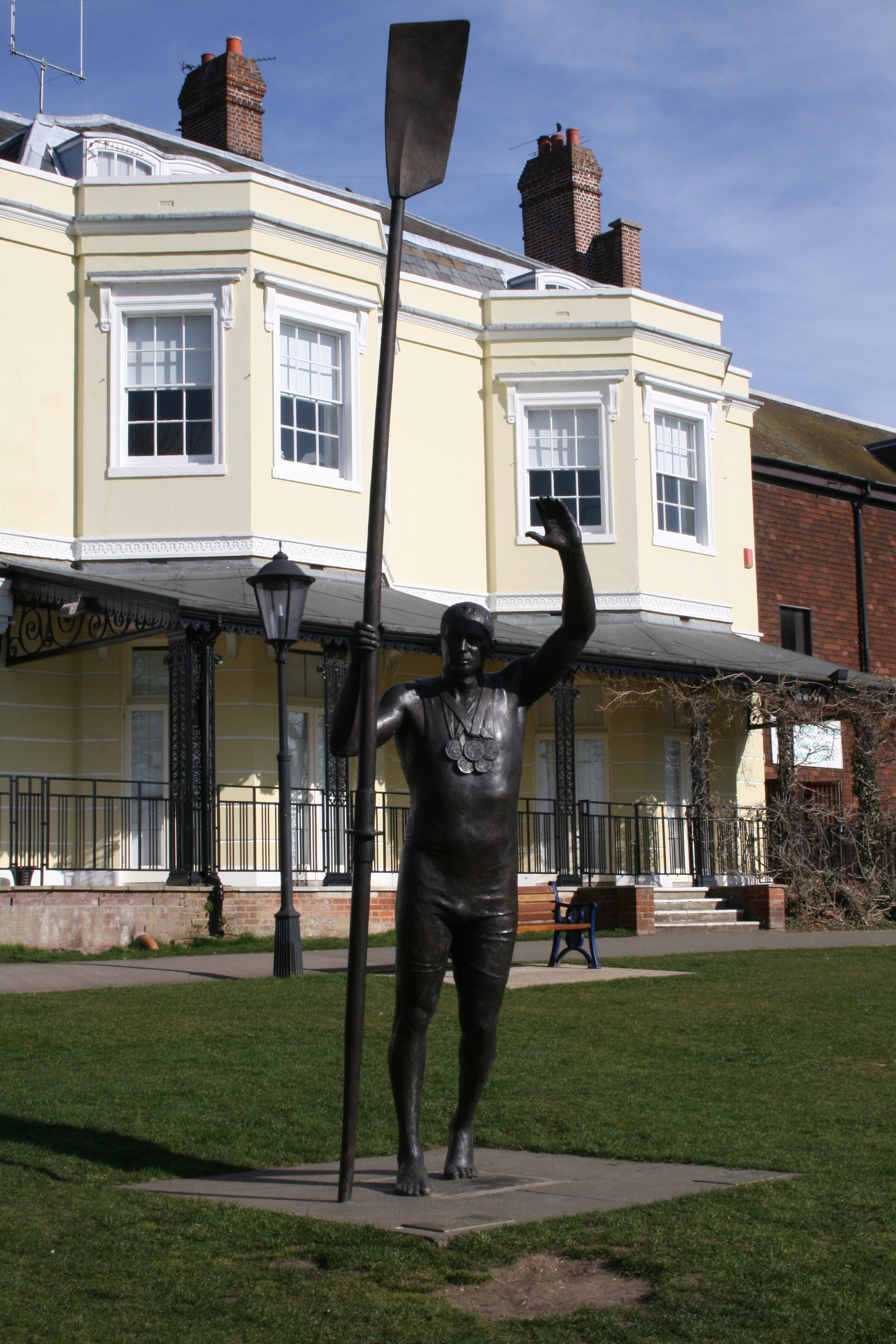
Statue of Sir Steve Redgrave in Higginson Park

=== Rowing ===
Marlow Rowing Club, founded in 1871, is one of Britain's premier rowing clubs and has produced many Olympic oarsmen including Sir Steve Redgrave. The club is based by Marlow Bridge and exercises above and below the lock. The Olympic lightweight men's double-sculls gold medallist at Beijing 2008, Zac Purchase, is a former member of Marlow Rowing Club.

=== Football ===
Marlow F.C. is the oldest football club in the town, currently playing in Tier 8 Southern Football League Division One Central.

Marlow F.C are the only football club in England to have applied for entry into the FA Cup every season since its inception in 1871. The first England captain Cuthbert Ottaway played for Marlow F.C. Ottaway was selected to lead the England team travelling to Partick to meet Scotland on 30 November 1872 in what is now recognised as the first international match to be played. The game ended in a 0–0 draw.

Another local football club, Marlow United F.C., plays in Tier 11 Thames Valley Premier League Division One and finished 2nd of 14 in the 2016/17 season.

=== Rugby ===
Marlow Rugby Club plays at Riverwoods Drive. It was founded in 1947 and runs a range of senior, youth and mini-rugby teams.

=== Cricket ===
There are two cricket clubs, Marlow Park CC, and Marlow Cricket Club which was founded in 1829 and is now part of Marlow Sports Club. Marlow Cricket Club has three Saturday teams and plays in the Thames Valley League. The Sports Club caters to field hockey, tennis, running, cycling, junior football.

=== Tennis ===
Marlow Tennis Club was founded in 1899 and also plays at Marlow Sports Club. It has four floodlit all-weather courts and fields men's, women's and mixed teams in Bucks, Berks and Farnham Common leagues.

=== Other sports ===
Marlow Sports Club also hosts five other sports, hockey, running (Marlow Striders), cycling (Marlow Riders), junior football, and petanque.

=== Regatta ===
There are two regattas associated with Marlow; the Marlow Town Regatta and Marlow International Regatta. Records indicate that a regatta took place annually on the River Thames in Marlow from 1855. The latter transferred to the purpose-built Dorney Lake, owned by Eton College, in 2003. Marlow still hosts its original river regatta which takes place annually in June.

== Local media ==
=== Television ===
Marlow is within the BBC London and ITV London region. Television signals are received from the Crystal Palace TV transmitter and one of the two local relay transmitters (Marlow Bottom and Wooburn).

=== Radio ===
Local radio stations are BBC Radio Berkshire on 94.6 FM, Heart South on 102.6 FM, and Marlow FM. The latter is a local community radio station that was launched on 11 May 2011. It broadcasts to Marlow and the surrounding areas on 97.5 FM, and also streams over the internet. The station provides travel and news updates for the local area.

=== Newspapers ===
The town is covered by the local newspaper, Bucks Free Press.

== Notable people ==
Notable current and former residents in approximate birth order.

- Sir William Borlase (1566 – 4 September 1629), English politician, founded Sir William Borlase Grammar School in Marlow in 1624 in memory of his son Henry Borlase, MP for Greater Marlow.
- Dr William Battie, an eminent 18th-century physician specialising in mental illness, built and lived in Court Garden House from 1758 until his death in 1776. Local lore has it that he forgot to include a staircase to the first floor, so it had to be added later. In 1789 his daughter sold the house to Richard Davenport, High Sheriff of Buckinghamshire, who lived there for 10 years, during which, Court Garden was described in Boydells History of the River Thames (1793), as "a fine Georgian house standing on a gentle eminence, a lawn of some extent descending gradually from it to the river." In 1926 the estate was saved for the people of Marlow, largely due to the efforts of local resident and Crimean War veteran General George Higginson, after whom Higginson Park is named.
- Percy Bysshe Shelley and Mary Shelley moved into a house in West Street in 1816. He composed The Revolt of Islam there in 1817, while both worked on Frankenstein. Thomas Love Peacock, who had suggested Shelley move to the town, wrote his novel Nightmare Abbey (1818) at a nearby house.

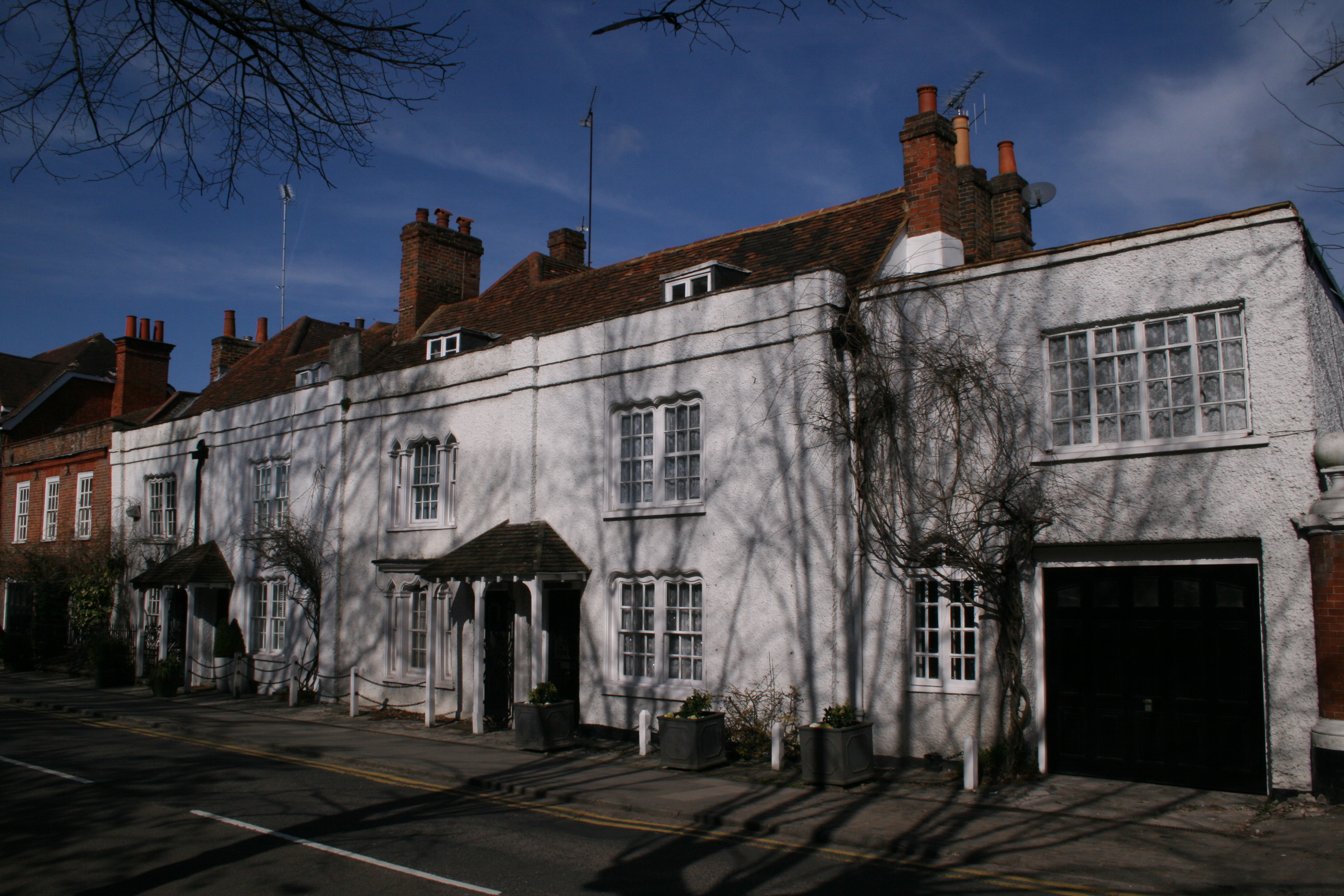
Percy Bysshe and Mary Shelley's house in Marlow

- Cuthbert Ottaway played for Marlow F.C. He was the first captain of the England football team and led his side in the first official international football match (1872).
- Jerome K. Jerome wrote part of Three Men in a Boat at a local pub, the Two Brewers.

MARLOW is one of the pleasantest river centres I know of. It is a bustling, lively little town; not very picturesque on the whole, it is true, but there are many quaint nooks and corners to be found in it.

— Jerome K. Jerome, Three Men In A Boat
- T. S. Eliot lived in West Street during the First World War.
- Princess Katherine of Greece and Denmark, youngest daughter of Constantine I of Greece and cousin of Prince Philip, Duke of Edinburgh, lived much of her later life in Marlow with her husband.
- Marlow Bottom has become the home of quintuple Olympic gold medallist rower Steve Redgrave, Britain's only athlete to have won gold medals at five consecutive Olympics. Higginson Park features a bronze statue of Sir Steven looking across the river towards the location of the finishing line of the Marlow Town Regatta. He is also commemorated in Redgrave Place.
- The star chef Heston Blumenthal, owner of The Fat Duck in Bray, Berkshire (voted Best Restaurant in the World in 2005) lived in Marlow until about 2017.
- Actress Anna Acton was born in Marlow and still lives in the town.
- Television and radio presenter Paul Ross, brother of Jonathan Ross, also lived in Marlow, having moved there after filming Celebrity Fit Club at nearby Bisham Abbey. He moved out of Marlow in 2013.
- Author, publisher, founding director of Bloomsbury Publishing and Quick Reads literacy editor David Reynolds grew up in Marlow.
- Japanese Formula One racing driver Takuma Sato was a Marlow resident, as was Bruno Senna, who lived in the same house.
- Pakistani cricketer and International Cricket Council (ICC) match Referee Wasim Raja lived in Marlow and worked as a cricket coach in a local school.
- Musician Jim Capaldi lived in Marlow for many years with his wife and two daughters until his death in 2005.
- England scrum-half and World Cup-winner Matt Dawson spent his childhood in Marlow and went to a local primary school.
- Ireland Cricket Captain, Andrew Balbirnie, spent his early childhood living on Chapel Street in Marlow.
- Peter Firth, Sir Harry Pearce in the BBC MI5 drama Spooks, is a Marlow resident.
- Andrew Strauss, former England cricket captain, moved to Little Marlow with his family in 2010.
- Tom Kerridge, Michelin Star chef, lives in Marlow with his wife and son.
- Beth Cullen-Kerridge, sculptor, has lived in Marlow since 2005.
- Chris Evans (presenter), radio and television personality, bought a property in Marlow in June 2019.
- Ricky Gervais, actor and writer, owns a property in Marlow.
- Shakin' Stevens, singer and songwriter, lives in Marlow.
- Rachel Burden, BBC Radio 5 Live presenter, grew up in Marlow.
- Naomi Riches lives in Marlow and has a gold postbox on the High Street as a commemoration for winning gold in the London 2012 Paralympics for adaptive rowing.
- Tom Chambers, winner of the sixth series of Strictly Come Dancing, lives in Marlow.
- Tyrrell Hatton, professional golfer, grew up in Marlow.

== Cultural references ==
- Marlow is mentioned several times in Jerome K. Jerome's 1889 humorous novel, Three Men in a Boat. The narrator and his two friends stay the night there at The Crown Hotel. Next morning, they create a small spectacle by buying a huge quantity of provisions from the town's various shops for their continued boat trip up the Thames.
- Robert Thorogood's murder mystery novel series The Marlow Murder Club, which in 2024 began airing as a TV series on British TV channel Drama, on UKTV Play and on PBS's Masterpiece, is set in Marlow.
- Marlow was the subject of a poem by Joseph Ashby-Sterry, A Marlow Madrigal.
- Reginald King composed 'June Night on Marlow Reach', a movement from his orchestral (or keyboard) suite In the Chilterns, in 1937.

== Gallery ==
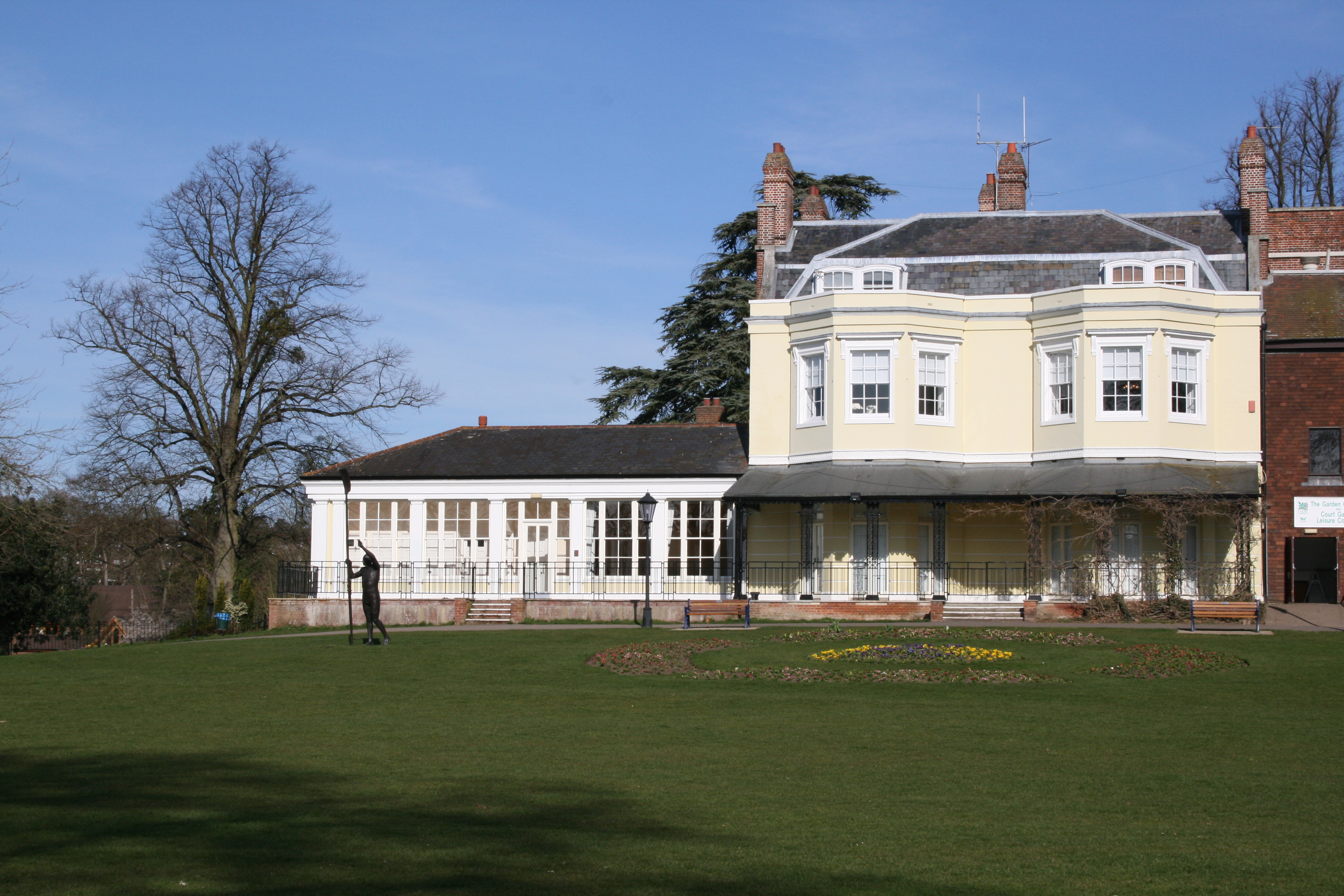
Court Garden House, former home of Dr William Battie

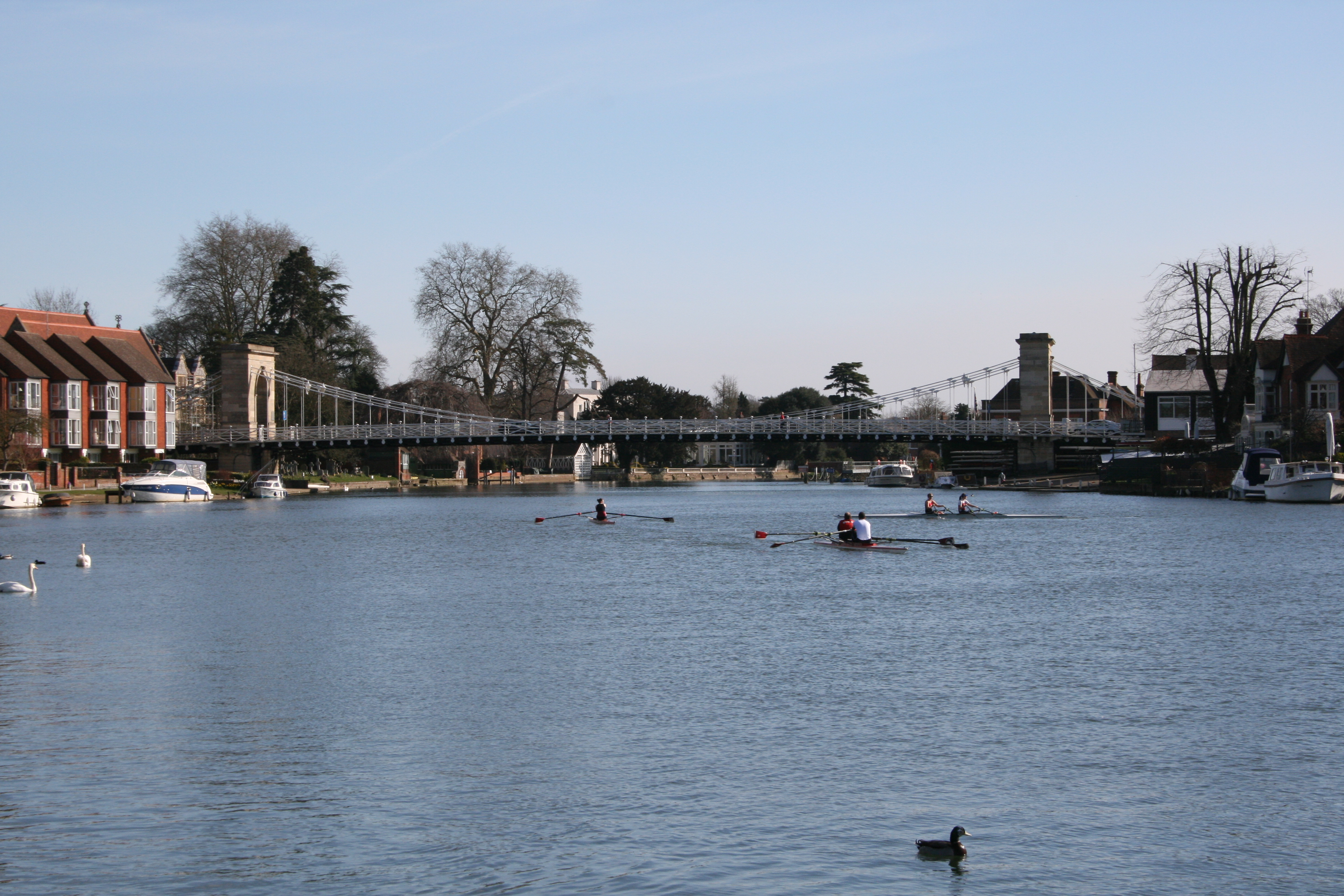
Rowers on the Thames at Marlow

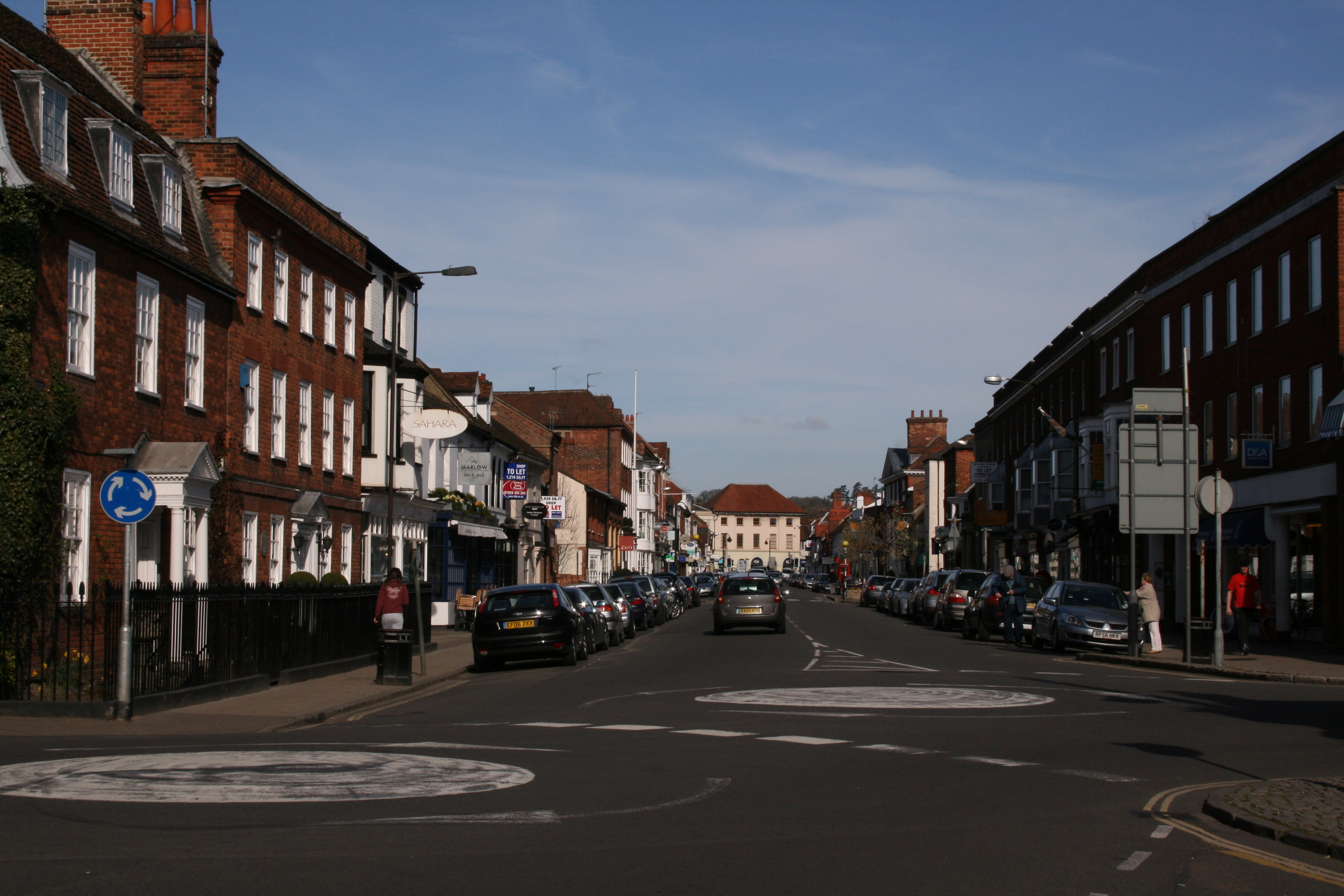
Marlow High Street

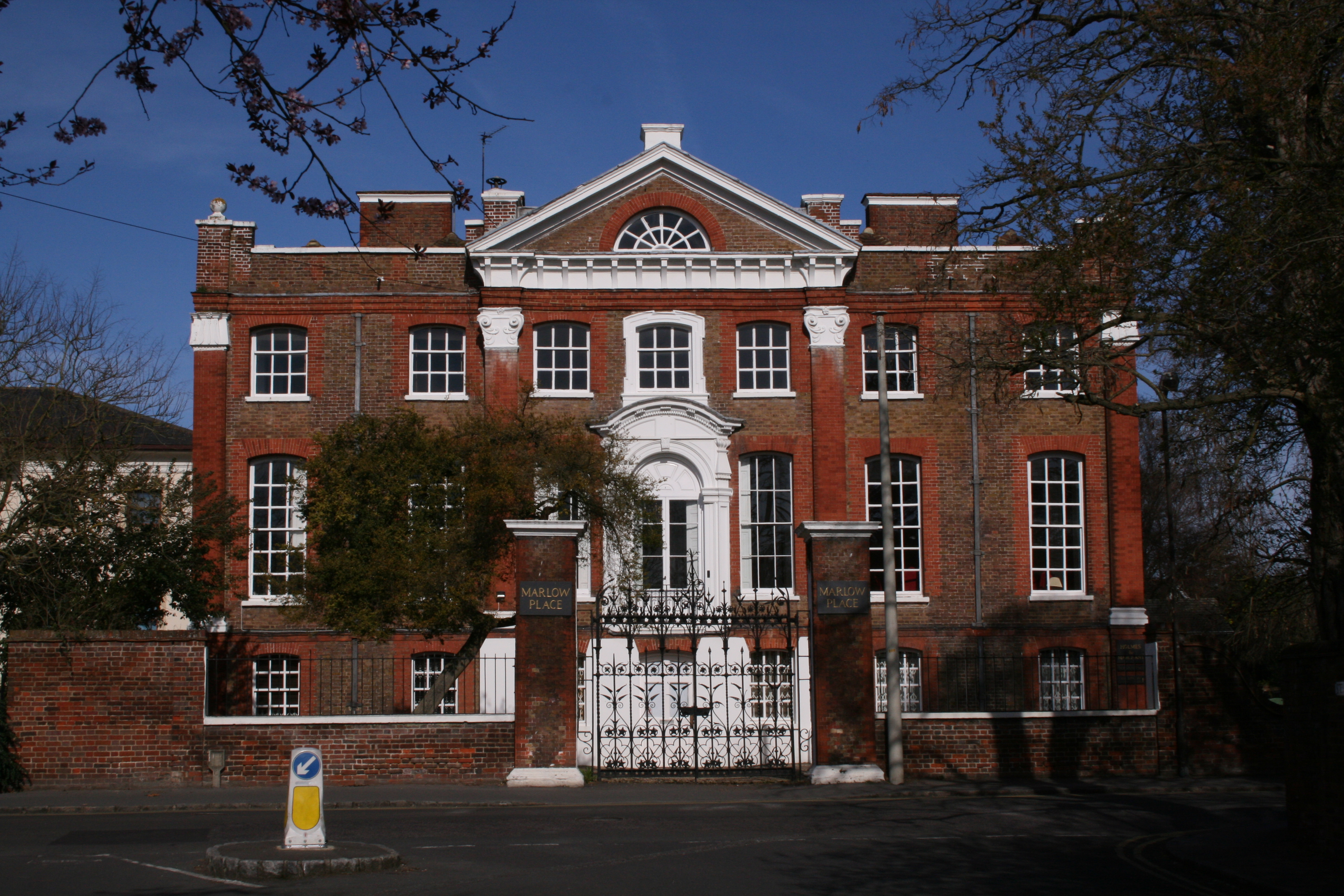
Marlow Place

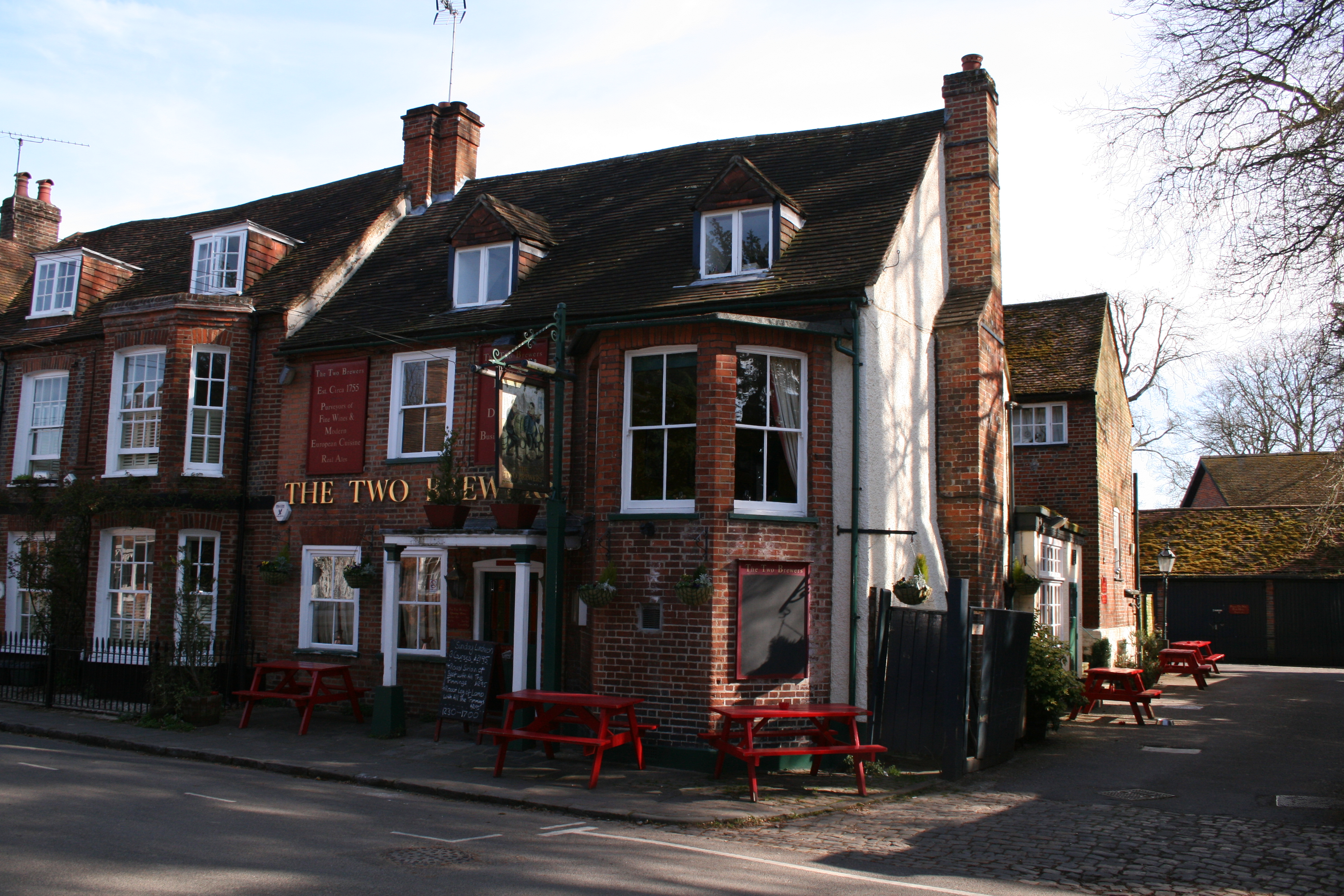
The Two Brewers, where Jerome K Jerome wrote much of Three Men in a Boat

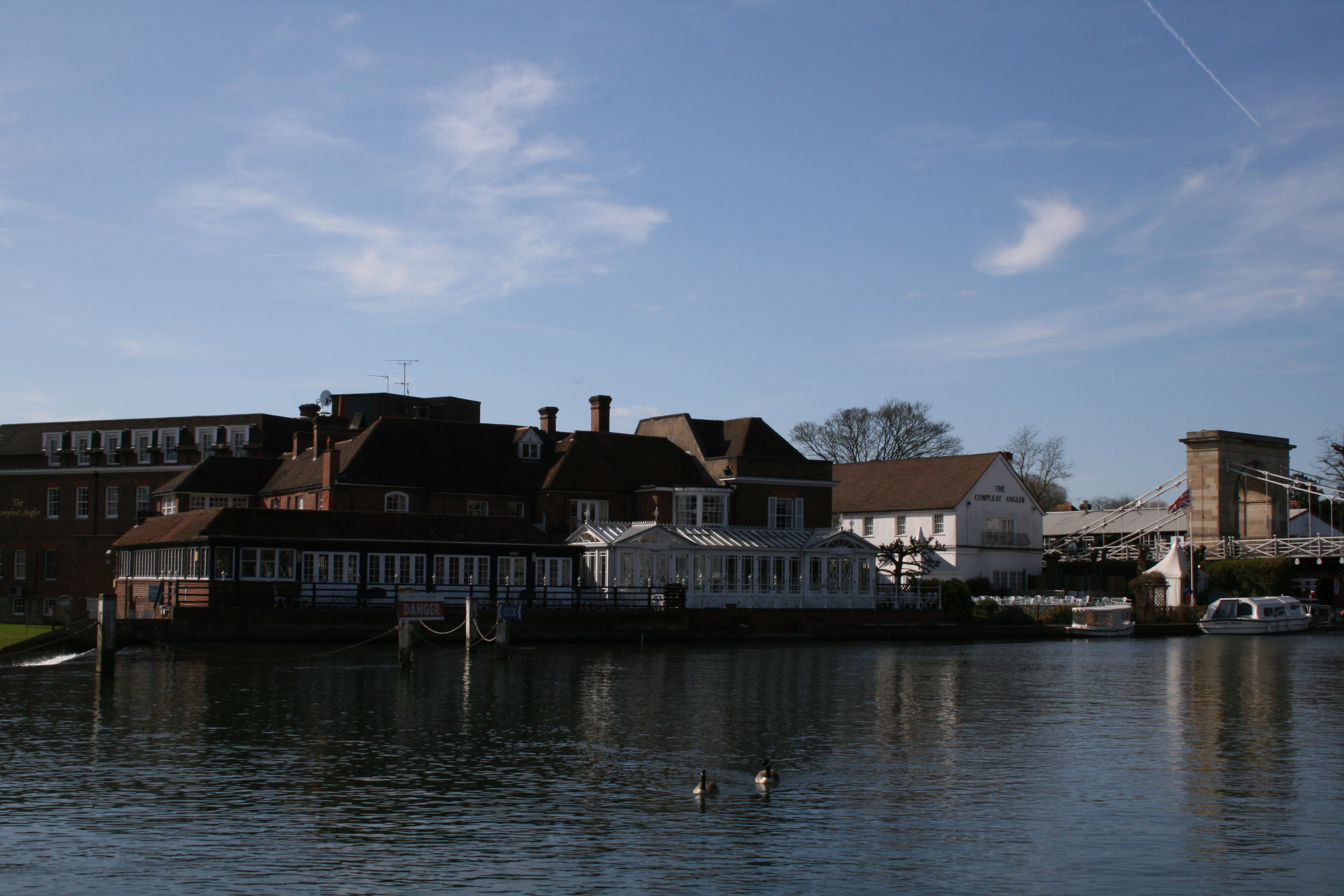
The Compleat Angler, Marlow

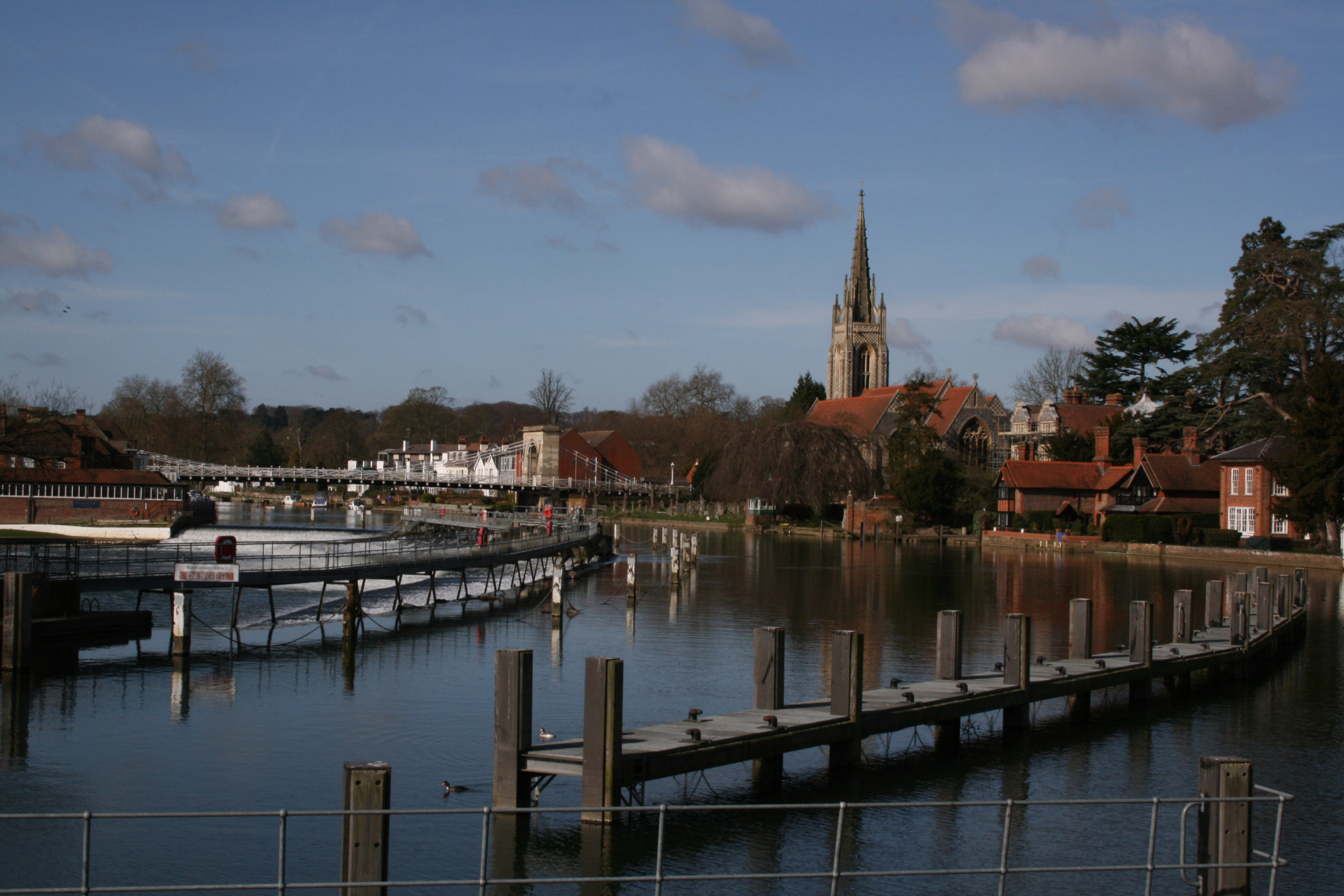
Looking towards Marlow from Marlow Lock

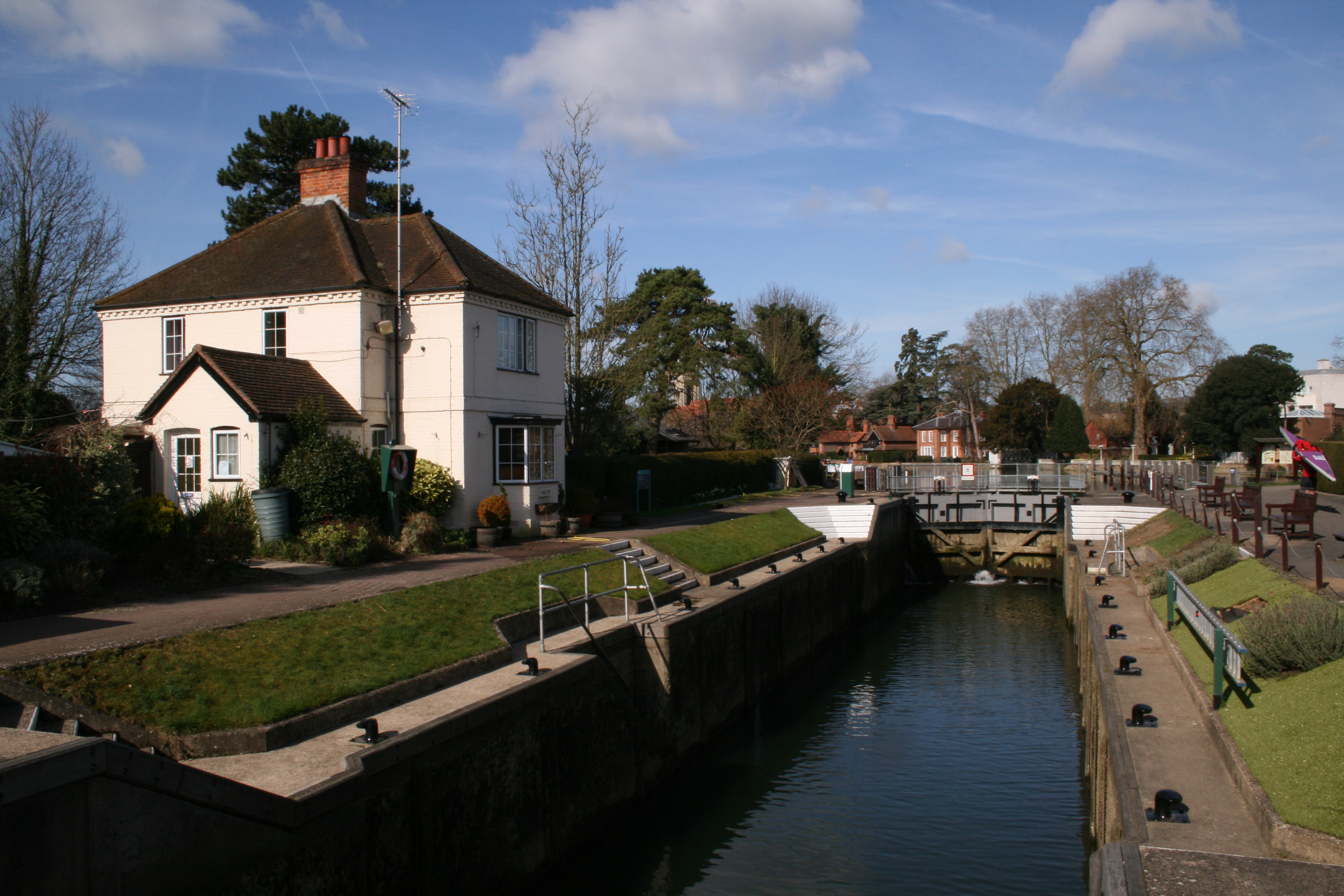
Marlow Lock

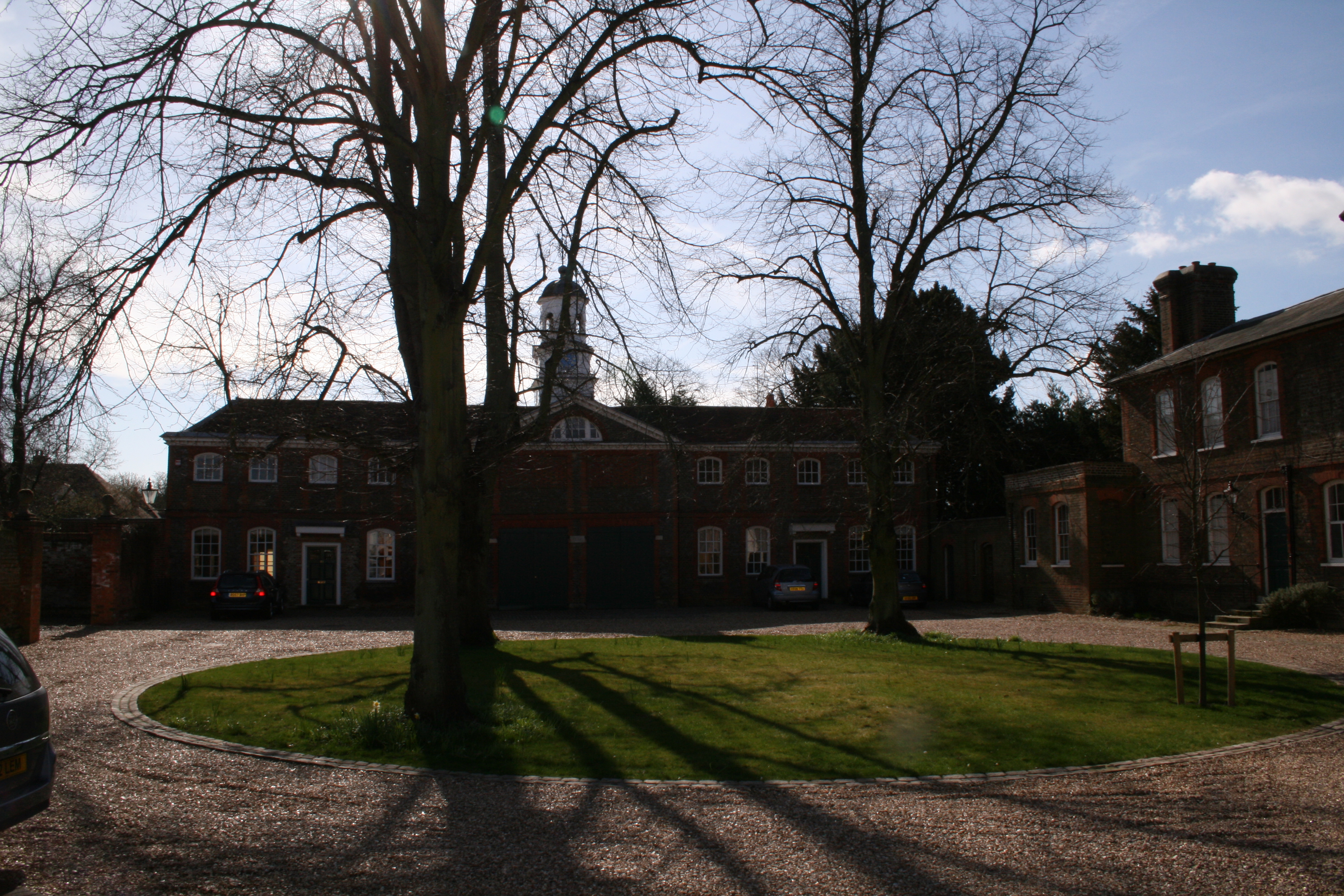
Former Royal Military College, Marlow 1802–1812

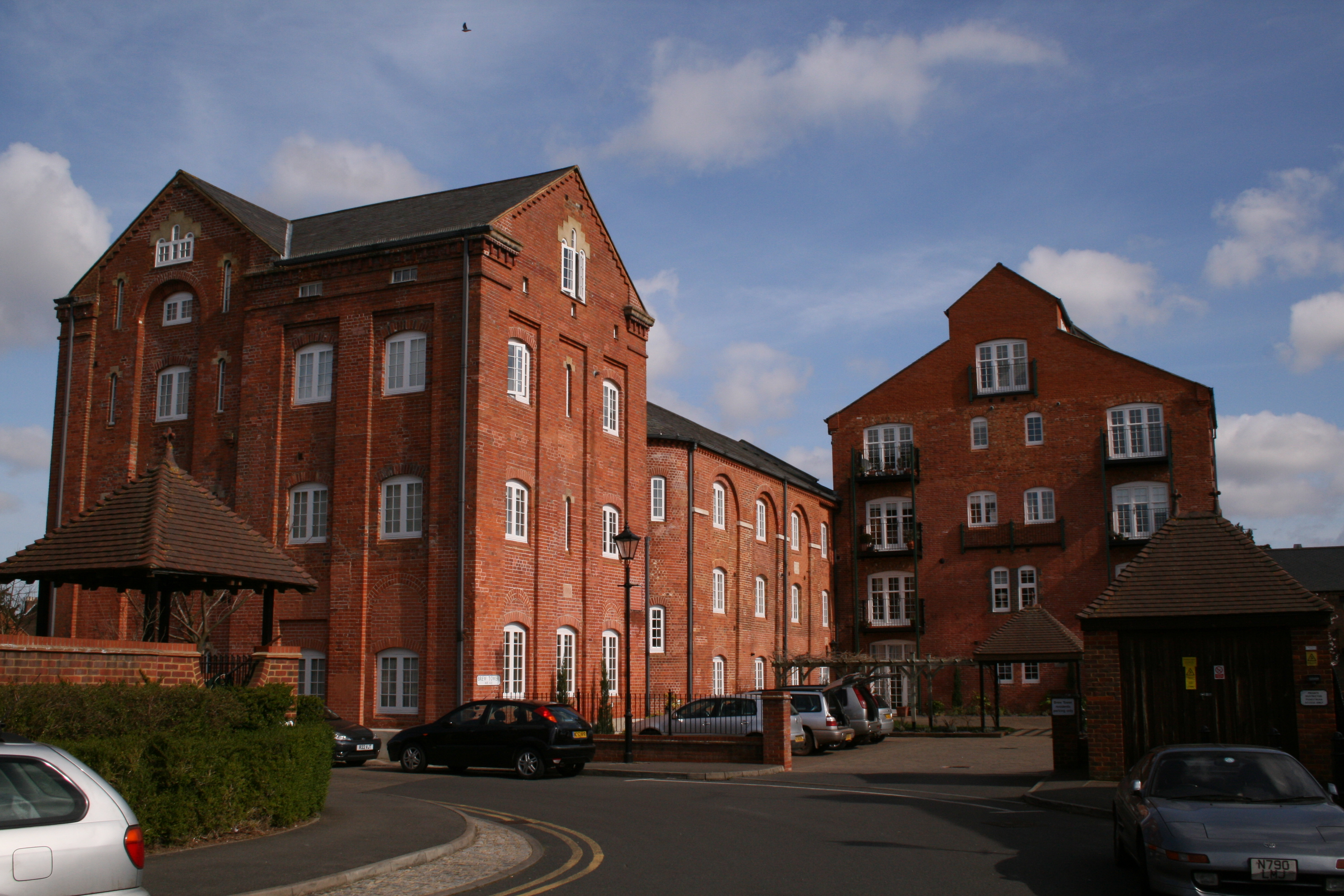
Former Wethered Brewery, Marlow

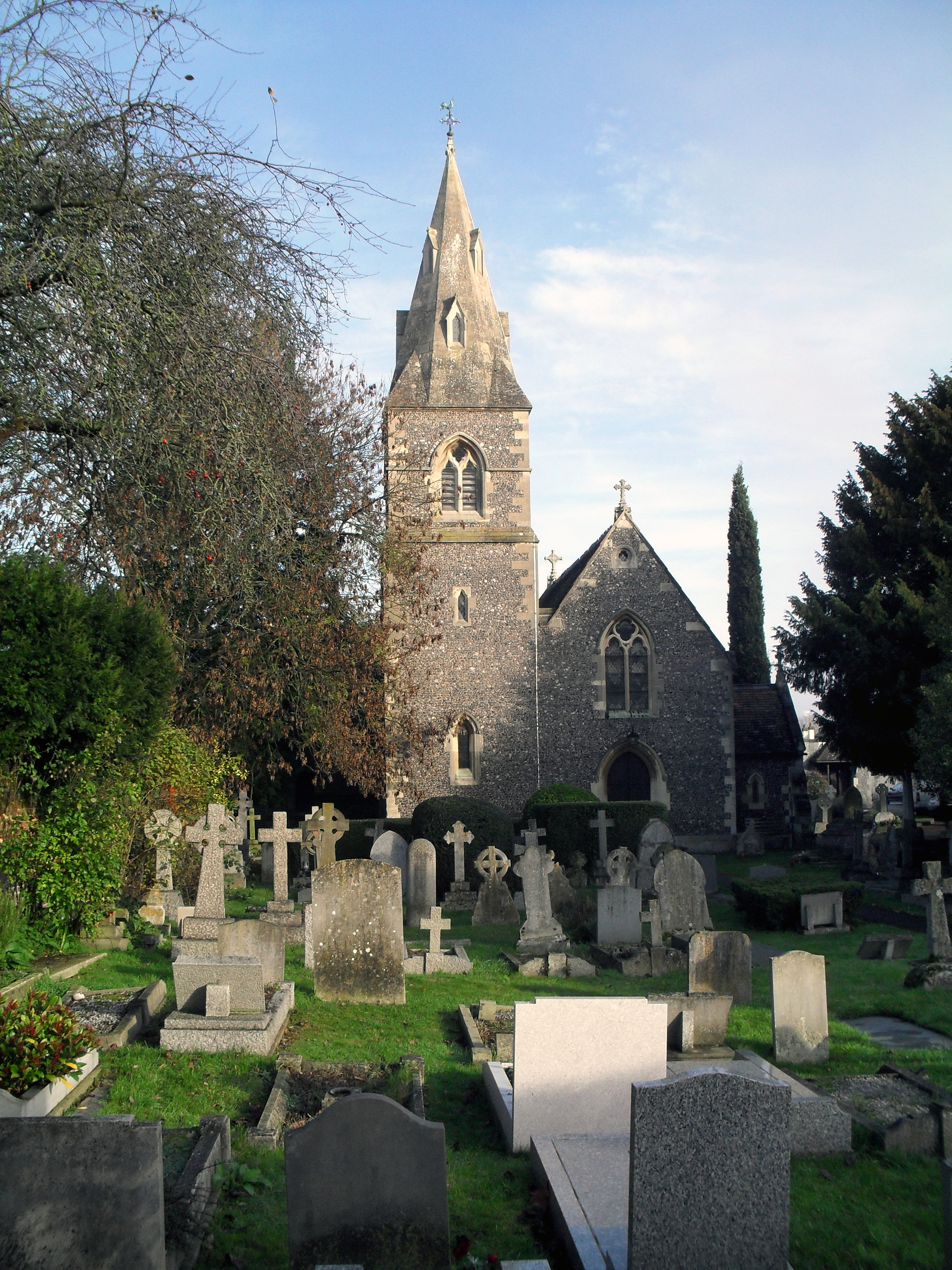
St Peter's Church, Marlow

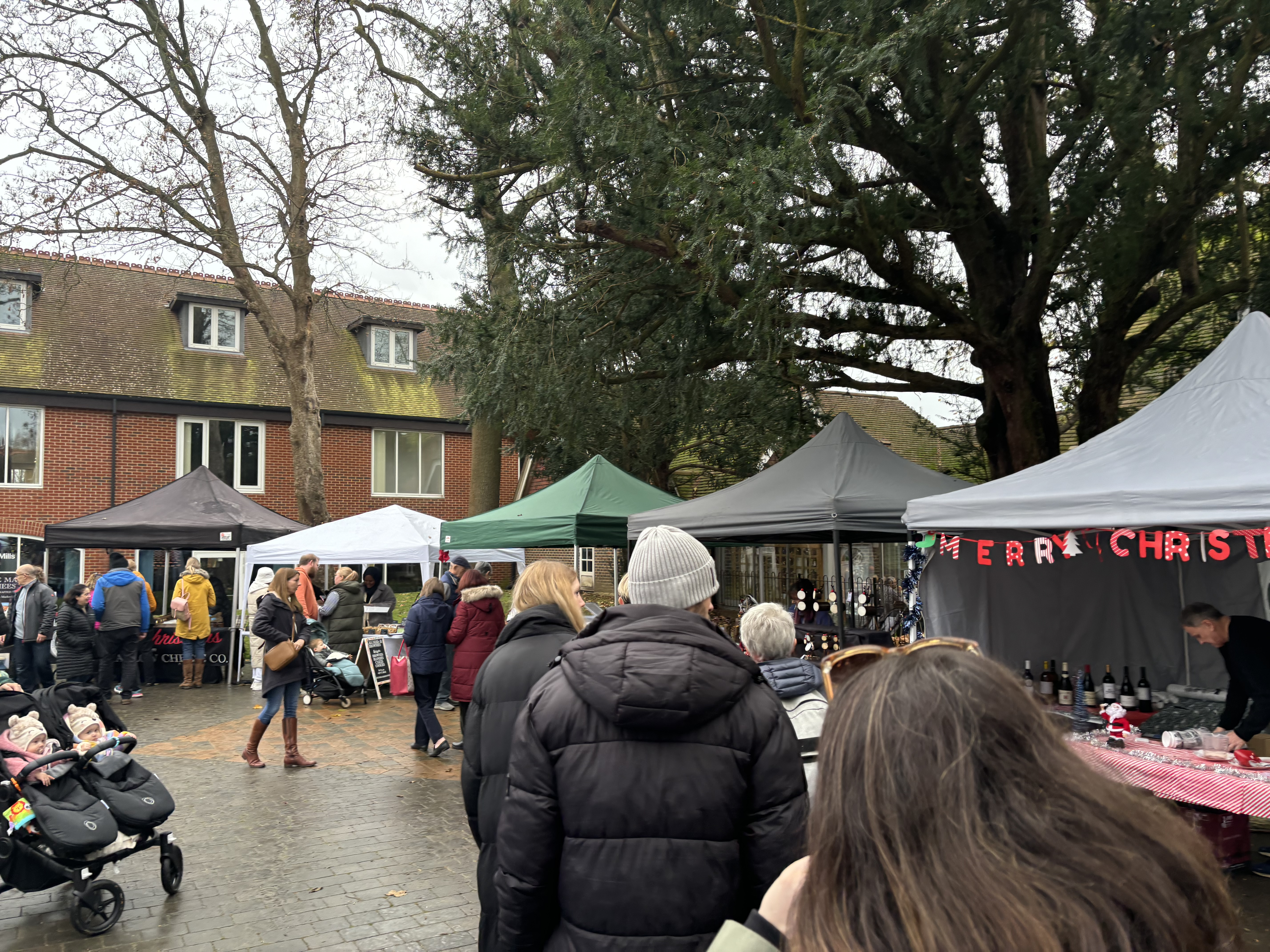
The Duckpond Market at Liston Court, Marlow
