= Disraeli Monument =

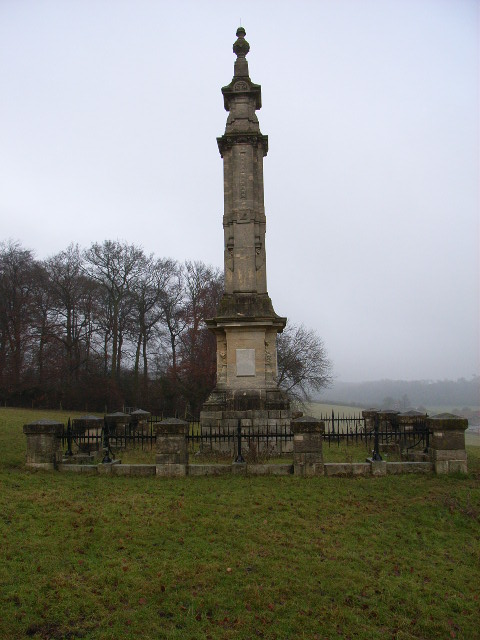
The monument in January 2006

The Disraeli Monument is a Grade II* listed memorial erected in 1862 to the British writer and scholar Isaac D'Israeli, designed by the architect Edward Buckton Lamb. It is located on Tinker's Hill in the Hughenden Valley near High Wycombe in Buckinghamshire.

It was erected in June 1862 at a cost of £500; Lamb was paid £200 for his work, and a Mr. Thomas Coates had sold the land on which the monument stands to the Disraelis for £20. The monument stands in fields near Hughenden Manor, the D'Israelis' country house. Windsor Castle could be seen from the monument at the time of its erection.

The monument is 50 ft in height and made from Bath stone.

The monument was commissioned by D'Israeli's daughter-in-law Mary Anne Disraeli, who was married to his eldest son, the politician and writer Benjamin Disraeli. The monument was secretly planned and erected by Mary Anne without her husband's knowledge. It was designed by architect Edward Buckton Lamb. The positive reception of the monument led to Lamb being hired to remodel Hughenden Manor for the Disraelis.

In a letter dated 21 August 1862 to Sarah Brydges Willyams, Disraeli described the new monument as "both for design, execution & even material is one of the most beautiful things not only in the County of Buckingham, but in England!". Disraeli repeated the sentiment in a letter to Lionel de Rothschild later that month.

== Inscription ==
On the east face of the monument a panel is inscribed:

In Memory of Isaac Disraeli, of Bradenham, in this County, Esq., and Hon D.C.L. of the University of Oxford, Who, by his happy genius, diffused among the multitude that elevating taste for literature, which, before his time, was the privilege only of the learned. This monument was raised in affectionate Remembrance by Mary-Ann, the wife of his eldest son, the Right. Hon Benjamin Disraeli, Lord of this Manor, Chancellor of the Exchequer 1852-8 and 9 and now for the sixth time Knight of this shire. June, 1862

The panel on the north face is inscribed

Mary Anne Disraeli Viscountess Beaconfield b. Dec. 19. 1872. Dulcis conjux
