= Court Garden, Marlow =

Building in Buckinghamshire, England

Coordinates: 51°34′04″N 0°46′37″W

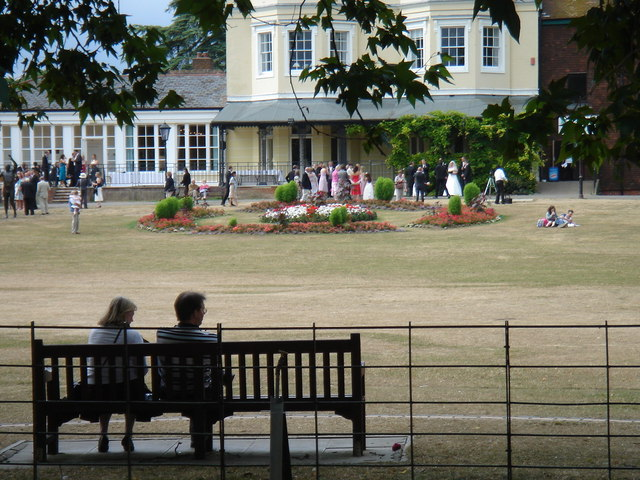
Court Garden, Marlow

Court Garden in Marlow, Buckinghamshire, England, is a Grade II* listed building on the National Heritage List for England. It was built as a house in about 1758 by Dr William Battie, an eminent physician. It was sold in 1776 to Richard Davenport and remained in the Davenport family until 1894. It was then sold and became the home of the Griffin family for the next thirty years. The house and gardens were bought by public subscription in 1926, with the grounds being made a public park called Higginson Park. Since 1934 the house itself has served as council offices and as a venue for special events.

== Dr William Battie ==
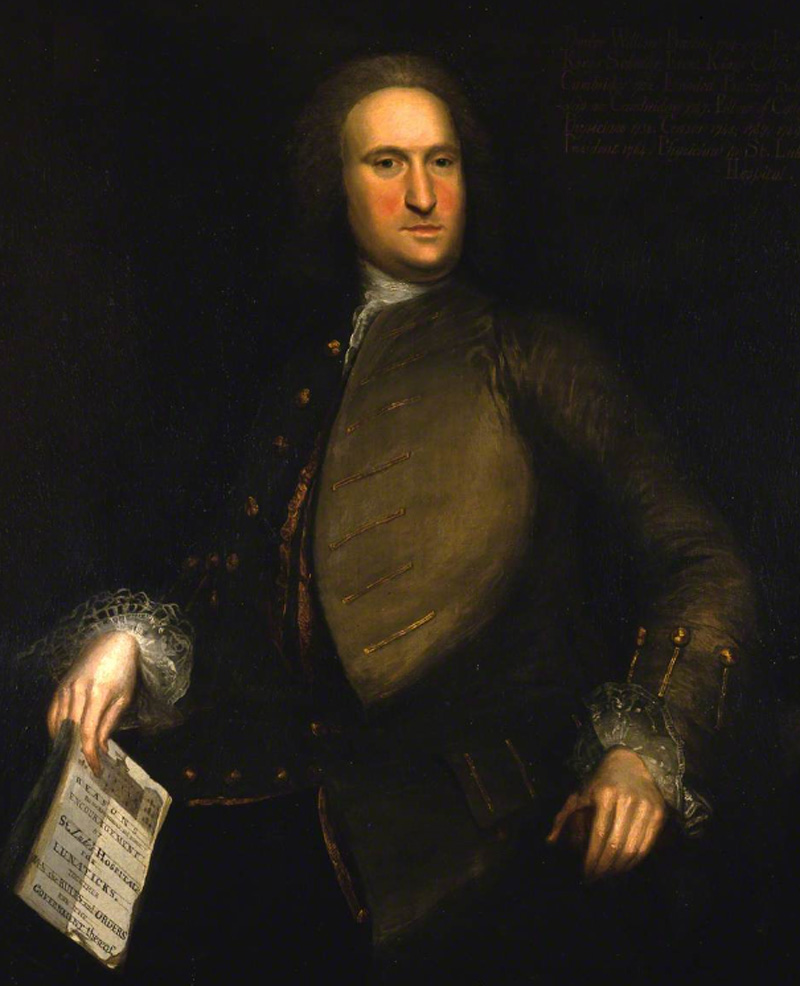
Dr William Battie in about 1750

William Battie (1704-1776) was born in 1704 in Modbury. His father was Reverend Edward Battie who was the Vicar of this town. He was educated at Eton College and then went to University of Cambridge where he won a Craven Scholarship. He began practicing as a physician in 1729 in Cambridge and then later in Uxbridge and finally in London where he had a very successful practice.

In 1740 he inherited a large fortune from his relative Edward Colman of Brent Eleigh Hall in Suffolk who had died a bachelor. In the previous year he had married Ann Goode who he had known since his childhood. She was the daughter of Barnham Goode a teacher at Eton when he had attended this school. They were married in Oxford and went to live in a house in Twickenham which he built for himself and his family in 1740. The couple had three daughters.

He became a fellow of the College of Physicians in 1738; censor in 1743, 1747, and 1749; Harveian orator in 1746; and president in 1764. He was Lumleian orator from 1749 to 1754.

He wrote numerous books on medical matters particularly mental illness and worked for many years at St Lukes Hospital in London. He died in 1776 and was buried at Kingston upon Thames near his wife. After his death his daughter Anne sold Court Garden to Richard Davenport.

== The Davenport family ==
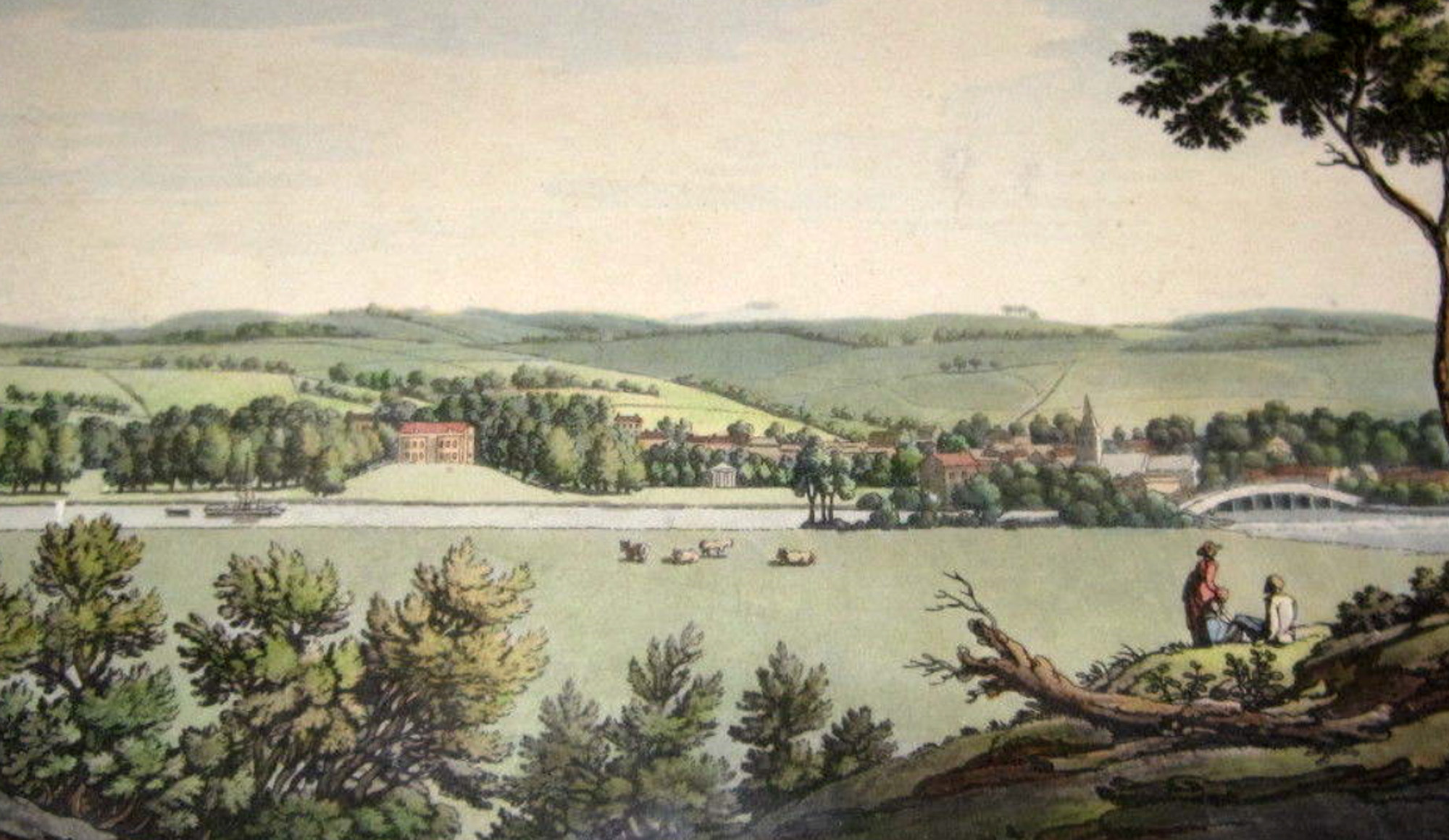
Court Garden in 1793 when Richard Davenport was the owner

Richard Davenport (1729-1799) who bought Court Garden in 1776 was a surgeon of Essex Street in London. He was the younger son of Davies Davenport (1696-1740) who owned Capesthorne Hall. In 1769 he married Fanny Maria Sanxay who was the daughter of Edmund Sanxay, a wealthy landowner from Cheam. Sanxay had only two daughters so when he died in 1787 Fanny Maria and her sister inherited his properties. She died in 1796 and Richard died in 1799. As they had no children Court Garden was left to his nephew Davies Davenport.

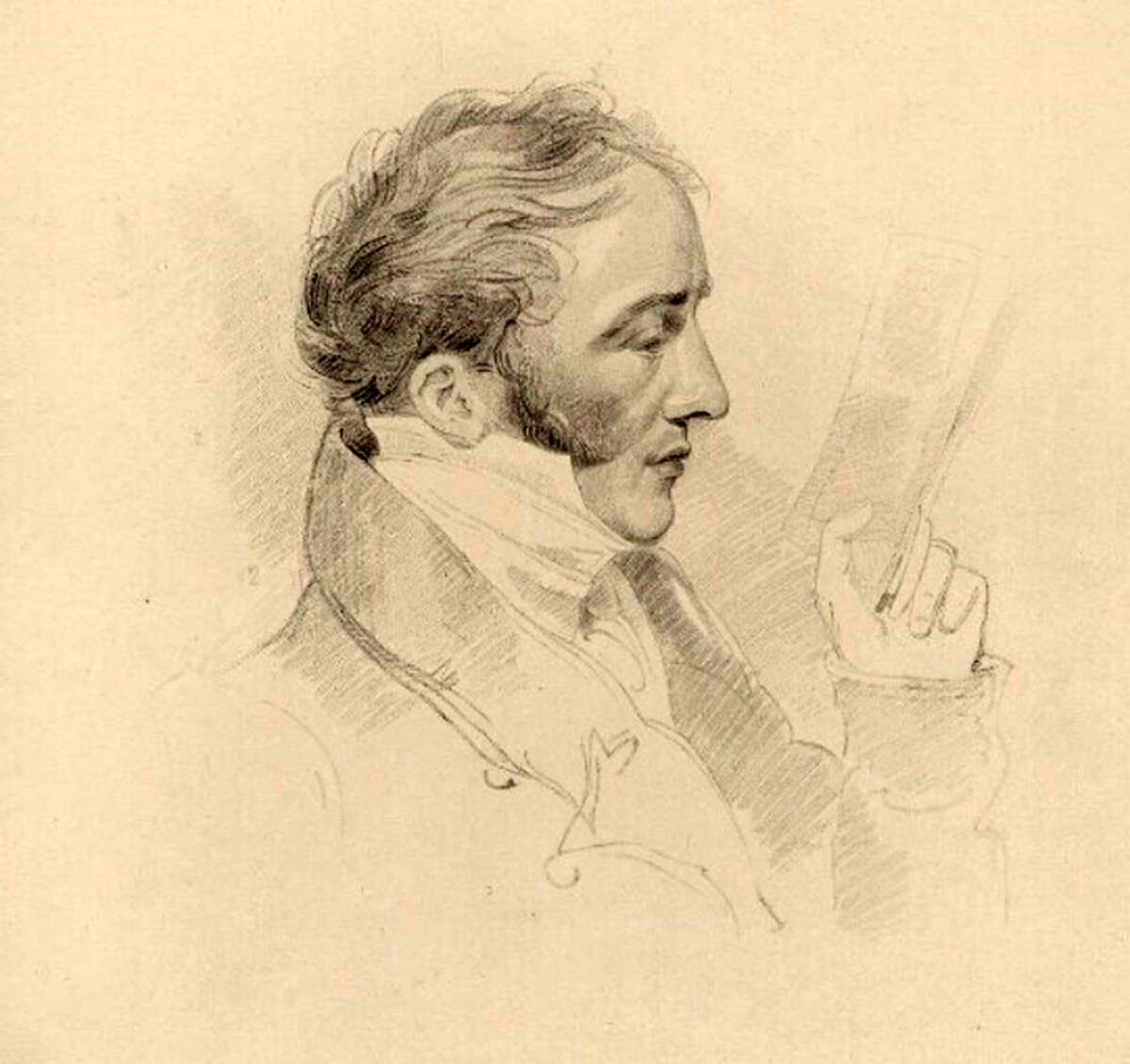
Edward Davies Davenport (1778-1847)

Davies Davenport (1757-1837) did not live in Court Garden because his main residence was his ancestral home of Capesthorne Hall. He rented it to various tenants one of whom was General Alexander Hope who in 1810 was appointed Governor of the Military College when it was in Marlow before it was moved to Sandhurst. The next resident was Sir Alan Hyde Gardner, 2nd Baron Gardner who was there until his death in 1815.

Davies Davenport died in 1837 and his son Edward Davies Davenport (1778-1847) inherited the house. He was a prominent Member of Parliament. Like his father he lived at Capesthorne Hall and rented Court Garden to tenants. He died in 1847 and his son Arthur Henry Davenport inherited the property. Arthur died in 1867 and as he was a bachelor and had no children his cousin William Bromley-Davenport (1821–1884) inherited the house. When he died in 1884 his son Sir William Bromley Davenport (1862-1949) became the owner.

During this time Court Garden continued to be a rental property. In about 1882 Anthony Hutton, an African merchant took a 21 year lease on the house. However in 1891 he decided to leave England and the remainder of the lease was taken by Robert Griffin. He later bought the property from Sir William Bromley Davenport who advertised the house for sale in 1894.

== Residents after 1900 ==
Robert Griffin (1838-1921) who owned the house by 1900 made significant repairs to the property which had been allowed to deteriorate before its sale. He was born in 1838 in Warwickshire. His father was an attorney and he also became a lawyer. In 1869 he married Caroline Sophia McClean. The couple had three children, two sons and a daughter. From 1900 until 1910 he represented Marlow on the Buckinghamshire County Council. He died in 1921 and the house was advertised for sale in 1926.

== Public uses after 1926 ==
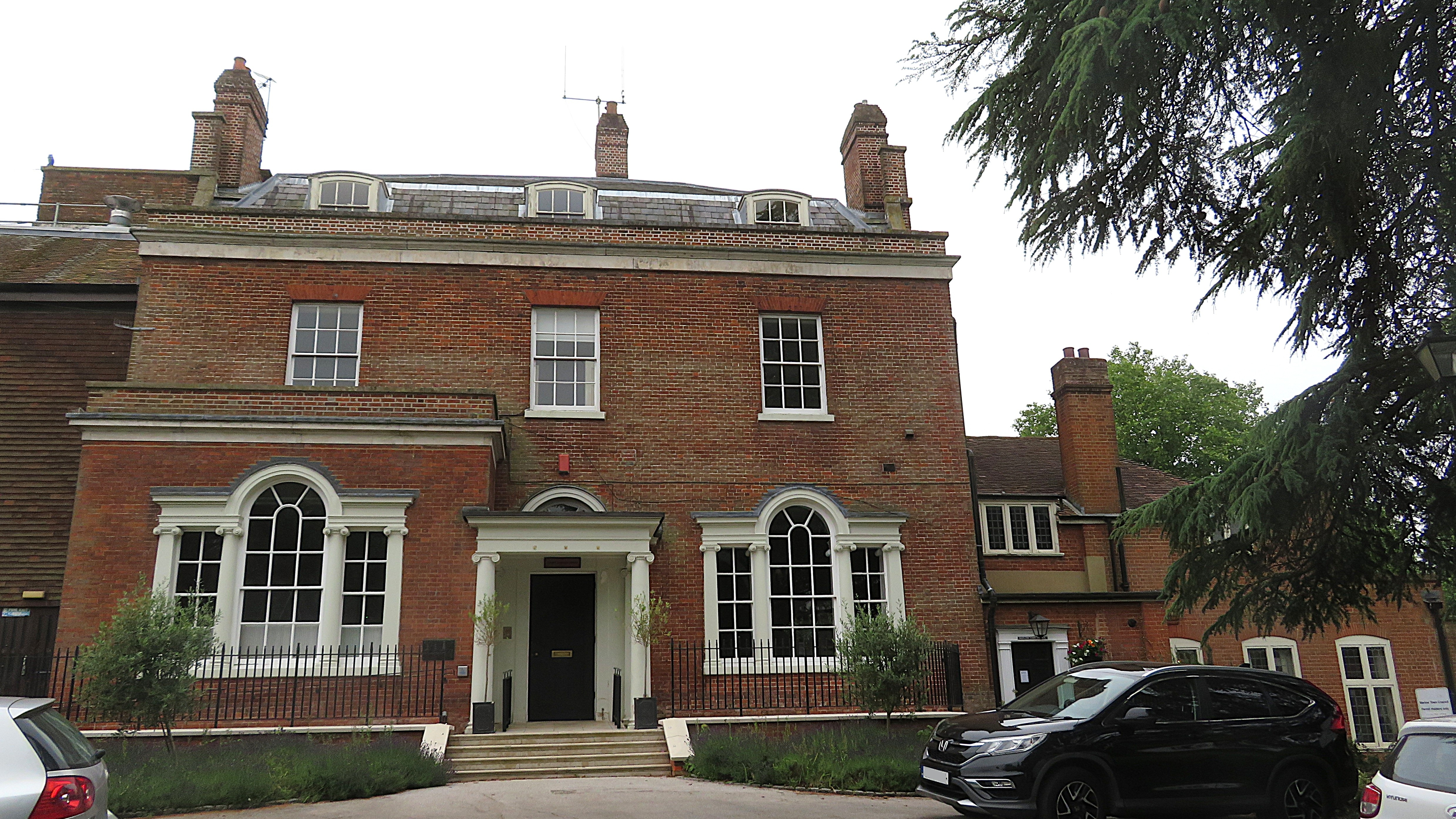
Front (north) elevation of house to Pound Lane.

The house and its immediate grounds were purchased by public subscription in 1926, with the grounds becoming a public park called Higginson Park, dedicated to General Sir George Higginson. He was a veteran of the Crimean War and native of Marlow, and he celebrated his 100th birthday in June 1926.

From 1934 onwards the building was used by Marlow Urban District Council as its offices. Following local government reorganisation in 1974 the building has served as the offices of Marlow Town Council. The Court Garden Leisure Centre and Marlow Museum were built as extensions to the north-east of the house.
