= Grade II* listed buildings in Chiltern =

There are over 20,000 Grade II* listed buildings in England. This page is a list of these buildings in the district of Chiltern in Buckinghamshire.

== List ==
Name	Location	Type	Completed (Note: The date given is the date used by Historic England as significant for the initial building or that of an important part in the structure's description.)	Date designated	Grid ref. (Note: The grid reference is based on the British national grid reference system, sometimes known as OSGB36, used by the Ordnance Survey.) Geo-coordinates	Entry number (Note: The "List Entry Number" is a unique number assigned to each listed building and scheduled monument by Historic England.)	Image
Elmodesham House	42 High Street, Amersham	House	Early 18th century	22 December 1958	SU9563497337; 51°40′00″N 0°37′07″W	1274720	Elmodesham House More images
Friends' Meeting House and Whielden Cottage	Whielden Street, Amersham	Meeting house	c.1600	22 December 1958	SU9560997044; 51°39′51″N 0°37′09″W	1274183	Friends' Meeting House and Whielden Cottage More images
High and Over with attached walls, steps and pergola	Highover Park, Amersham	Country house	1928–31	28 January 1971	SU9662997394; 51°40′01″N 0°36′15″W	1237711	High and Over with attached walls, steps and pergola More images
Market Hall	High Street, Amersham	Market hall	1682	22 December 1958	SU9575497322; 51°39′59″N 0°37′01″W	1221420	Market Hall More images
Sir William Drake's Almshouses	94 to 104 High Street, Amersham	Almshouses	1657	22 December 1958	SU9545897408; 51°40′02″N 0°37′16″W	1222353	Sir William Drake's Almshouses More images
The Gables	27 High Street, Amersham	House	Late 16th century	22 December 1958	SU9573597337; 51°40′00″N 0°37′02″W	1221468	The Gables More images
The King's Arms Hotel	30 High Street, Amersham	Cross-wing house	16th century	22 December 1958	SU9567697323; 51°40′00″N 0°37′05″W	1274789	The King's Arms Hotel More images
56, 58, 60 High Street	Amersham	Timber-framed house	16th century	22 December 1958	SU9557097366; 51°40′01″N 0°37′10″W	1222344	56, 58, 60 High Street More images
Parish Church of St John the Evangelist	Ashley Green	Parish church	1873	30 July 1984	SP9765405206; 51°44′13″N 0°35′14″W	1124856	Parish Church of St John the Evangelist More images
The Old Rectory	Dean Way, Chalfont St Giles	House	Late 17th century	22 December 1958	SU9891693449; 51°37′52″N 0°34′20″W	1125008	Upload Photo
The Vache	Chalfont St Giles	House	15th century	22 December 1958	SU9963794495; 51°38′26″N 0°33′42″W	1161651	The Vache More images
Parish Church of St Peter	Chalfont St Peter	Church	Medieval	22 December 1958	TQ0004690873; 51°36′28″N 0°33′24″W	1311461	Parish Church of St Peter More images
Shrub's Wood including attached walls and planting boxes surrounding garage court and patio	Chalfont St Peter	House	1933–34	30 July 1984	TQ0051394213; 51°38′16″N 0°32′56″W	1158476	Shrub's Wood including attached walls and planting boxes surrounding garage court and patio More images
Chapel at Great Hundridge Manor	Hyde Heath, Chartridge	House	1958	22 December 1958	SP9326701619; 51°42′20″N 0°39′06″W	1124900	Upload Photo
Great Hundridge Manor	Hyde Heath, Chartridge	House	Late 17th century	22 December 1958	SP9323401628; 51°42′20″N 0°39′08″W	1162783	Upload Photo
Chenies Chapel (Baptist)	Chenies	Baptist chapel	1770s	30 July 1984	TQ0211098135; 51°40′22″N 0°31′29″W	1124803	Chenies Chapel (Baptist) More images
Great Germains	Chesham	Timber-framed house	Mediaeval	10 November 1951	SP9569601163; 51°42′04″N 0°37′00″W	1124621	Upload Photo
Hollybush Farmhouse	Chesham	Farmhouse	Early 17th century	7 September 1973	SP9731902112; 51°42′34″N 0°35′34″W	1311573	Upload Photo
Little Germains	Chesham	House	c.1540	10 November 1951	SP9553700976; 51°41′58″N 0°37′08″W	1158567	Upload Photo
Vale Farmhouse	Chesham Vale, Chesham	Farmhouse	Late 15th century	10 November 1951	SP9621303448; 51°43′17″N 0°36′31″W	1311545	Upload Photo
54 and 56 Church Street	Chesham	Timber-framed house	14th century	10 November 1951	SP9575501462; 51°42′13″N 0°36′57″W	1332597	54 and 56 Church Street
Church of St Leonard	St Leonards, Cholesbury-cum-St. Leonards	Chapel of Ease	15th century	22 December 1958	SP9099807065; 51°45′18″N 0°40′59″W	1162947	Church of St Leonard More images
Church of All Saints	Coleshill	Church	1861	22 December 1958	SU9474495137; 51°38′49″N 0°37′55″W	1239441	Church of All Saints More images
Abbey Farmhouse	Church Street, Great Missenden	Timber-framed house	Early 15th century	30 July 1984	SP8970701131; 51°42′06″N 0°42′12″W	1158934	Abbey Farmhouse More images
Barn at rear of the George Public House	Great Missenden	Court house	15th century or early 16th century	22 December 1958	SP8953801120; 51°42′06″N 0°42′21″W	1124795	Barn at rear of the George Public House More images
Elmhurst (Flats Nos 1–7 consec.)	Great Missenden	Apartment	Late 16th century	5 August 1977	SP8928401582; 51°42′21″N 0°42′33″W	1332522	Elmhurst (Flats Nos 1–7 consec.) More images
The George Public House	Great Missenden	House	Late 15th century or early 16th century	30 July 1984	SP8954501130; 51°42′06″N 0°42′20″W	1159193	The George Public House More images
Beel House	Little Chalfont	Country house	Earlier	22 December 1958	SU9878897414; 51°40′01″N 0°34′23″W	1238695	Upload Photo
Church of the Holy Trinity	Penn Street, Penn	Church	1849	22 December 1958	SU9236296247; 51°39′27″N 0°39′58″W	1124951	Church of the Holy Trinity More images
Holly Mount	Knotty Green, Penn	House	1905–07	8 October 1973	SU9317992919; 51°37′39″N 0°39′19″W	1162506	Upload Photo
The Knoll	Penn	House	Late 17th century	22 June 1956	SU9166693229; 51°37′49″N 0°40′37″W	1162397	Upload Photo

== See also ==
- Grade I listed buildings in Buckinghamshire
- Grade II* listed buildings in Buckinghamshire
  - Grade II* listed buildings in South Bucks
  - Grade II* listed buildings in Wycombe
  - Grade II* listed buildings in Aylesbury Vale
  - Grade II* listed buildings in Borough of Milton Keynes
