= Grade II* listed buildings in Buckinghamshire =

Buckinghamshire shown within England

The county of Buckinghamshire is divided into five districts. The districts of Buckinghamshire are South Bucks, Chiltern, Wycombe, Aylesbury Vale and Borough of Milton Keynes.

As there are 357 Grade II* listed buildings in the county they have been split into separate lists for each district.

- Grade II* listed buildings in South Bucks
- Grade II* listed buildings in Chiltern
- Grade II* listed buildings in Wycombe
- Grade II* listed buildings in Aylesbury Vale
- Grade II* listed buildings in the Borough of Milton Keynes

== See also ==
- Grade I listed buildings in Buckinghamshire
