= Knotty Green =

Coordinates: 51.622°N 0.655°W

- The Red Lion Knotty Green

- Location within Buckinghamshire
- OS grid reference: SU932922
- Civil parish: Penn
- Unitary authority: Buckinghamshire
- Ceremonial county: Buckinghamshire
- Region: South East
- Country: England
- Sovereign state: United Kingdom
- Post town: Beaconsfield
- Postcode district: HP9
- Dialling code: 01494
- Police: Thames Valley
- Fire: Buckinghamshire
- Ambulance: South Central
- UK Parliament: Chesham & Amersham

Knotty Green was once a rural hamlet in the Buckinghamshire Chiltern Hills. It is characterised by large houses set in their own extensive grounds and though it remains within the civil parish of Penn today it has become contiguous with the market town of Beaconsfield. Houses in the area of Knotty Green are often some of the most expensive in the country with houses often exceeding 6,000 sq ft, and £3 million in value.

== History ==
The centre of the old hamlet is still identifiable at the junction of Penn Road and Forty Green Road where there remains a remnant of the old green from which the hamlet took part of its name. The name of the hamlet can be traced back to the 13th century. Knotty Green, or Nattuc as it was called in 1222, takes its name from Old English nattuc (rough grass of tussocks) that grew on the green.

There are several surviving buildings built in the 15th and 16th centuries, including timber-framed hall house Baylins Farm (or Beelings Manor) dating back to 1450. Opposite the cricket pitch stands Hutchins Barn, a 16th-century timbered house with a minstrels' gallery. Eghams Farm, built in Tudor times, is a private residence and stands on a path leading to Hogback Wood.

In one corner of the small recreation area adjoining the cricket pitch, there is an old dew pond formerly used for sheep dipping and reputed to have been in existence for 400 years.

The development that followed the arrival of the railway in Beaconsfield in 1906 increased the population of the parish as a whole by nearly 50 per cent in five years, but it was confined to the Penn Road and Forty Green Road. There was still an obvious dividing line between the parishes of Penn and Beaconsfield, where the boundary stream ran under the Penn Road, and where Beaconsfield's pavement and new houses stopped abruptly. Development at this time included a house by the architect Charles Voysey, completed in 1907. Knotty Green also contains a 20th-century water garden at Juniper Hill.

== Present day ==
At the centre of the hamlet is Knotty Green Cricket Club, and a children's playground. There are two pubs:

- The Royal Standard of England – thought to be the oldest freehouse in England, the pub is located in the neighbouring hamlet of Forty Green. Known as The Ship from 1213 to 1663, it adopted its current name when the restored monarch Charles II allowed the name change as a reward for offering the supporters of his father, (Charles I), a safe haven during the English Civil War. Charles II is thought to have stayed at the inn with a mistress. A popular filming location, it has appeared in Hot Fuzz and The Theory of Everything.
- The Red Lion – dates back to 1753.

== Notable people ==
- Val Doonican (1927–2015), Irish singer
- Michael Mosley (1957–2024), broadcaster

== See also ==
- Holly Mount, Knotty Green
