= Grade II* listed buildings in South Bucks =

There are over 20,000 Grade II* listed buildings in England. This page is a list of these buildings in the district of South Bucks in Buckinghamshire.

== List ==
Name	Location	Type	Completed (Note: The date given is the date used by Historic England as significant for the initial building or that of an important part in the structure's description.)	Date designated	Grid ref. (Note: The grid reference is based on the British national grid reference system, sometimes known as OSGB36, used by the Ordnance Survey.) Geo-coordinates	Entry number (Note: The "List Entry Number" is a unique number assigned to each listed building and scheduled monument by Historic England.)	Image
Africa House, Burke Lodge	Beaconsfield, South Bucks	House	C16/C17	19 May 1950	SU9460290085; 51°36′06″N 0°38′08″W	1124572	Africa House, Burke Lodge More images
Boathouse at Foot of Lake at Hall Barn	Hall Barn Estate, Beaconsfield	Boat House	Early 18th century	24 April 1985	SU9424088968; 51°35′30″N 0°38′28″W	1310579	Upload Photo
Hall Barn	Hall Barn Estate, Beaconsfield	Country House	Post 1651	19 May 1950	SU9434289223; 51°35′38″N 0°38′22″W	1160418	Hall Barn More images
Obelisk at Hall Barn	Hall Barn Estate, Beaconsfield	Obelisk	Early 18th century	24 April 1985	SU9387089182; 51°35′37″N 0°38′47″W	1310581	Upload Photo
Temple of Venus at Hall Barn	Hall Barn Estate, Beaconsfield	Temple	Early 18th century	19 May 1950	SU9391688964; 51°35′30″N 0°38′44″W	1332613	Upload Photo
Hall Place	Beaconsfield	House	18th century	19 May 1950	SU9441290039; 51°36′05″N 0°38′18″W	1124518	Upload Photo
Parish Church of St Mary and All Saints	Beaconsfield	Parish Church	Late 15th century	19 May 1950	SU9449090003; 51°36′03″N 0°38′14″W	1124547	Parish Church of St Mary and All Saints More images
The Old Rectory (adjoining West Side of Churchyard)	Beaconsfield	Vicarage	16th century	19 May 1950	SU9452889904; 51°36′00″N 0°38′12″W	1160916	The Old Rectory (adjoining West Side of Churchyard)
Tomb of Edmund Waller South East of Parish Church of St Mary and All Saints	Beaconsfield	Obelisk	1687	24 April 1985	SU9452389980; 51°36′03″N 0°38′12″W	1160900	Tomb of Edmund Waller South East of Parish Church of St Mary and All Saints More images
Burnham Beeches Hotel: Entrance Gates and Curtain Walls	Burnham	Gate	18th century	24 April 1985	SU9383983139; 51°32′22″N 0°38′54″W	1124496	Upload Photo
Church of St Anne	Littleworth Common, Burnham	Church	1866	23 September 1955	SU9345086457; 51°34′09″N 0°39′11″W	1124522	Church of St Anne More images
Church of St Peter	Burnham	Parish Church	13th century	23 September 1955	SU9305682397; 51°31′58″N 0°39′35″W	1124528	Church of St Peter More images
Nashdom	Burnham	House	Modern	23 September 1955	SU9199384292; 51°33′00″N 0°40′29″W	1332673	Nashdom More images
Footbridge across River Colne, to South of Denham Court	Denham Court, Denham	Footbridge	c. 1850	30 May 1986	TQ0515187330; 51°34′30″N 0°29′03″W	1200391	Footbridge across River Colne, to South of Denham Court
Hills House	Denham	House	Late 17th century	23 September 1955	TQ0424387024; 51°34′21″N 0°29′50″W	1332704	Hills House More images
Church of St James	Fulmer	Parish Church	1610	23 September 1955	SU9990485689; 51°33′40″N 0°33′37″W	1124420	Church of St James More images
Church of St James	Gerrards Cross	Bell Tower	1859	23 September 1955	TQ0009387924; 51°34′53″N 0°33′25″W	1124389	Church of St James More images
Shell House	Hedgerley	House	Late 17th century	23 September 1955	SU9701487673; 51°34′46″N 0°36′05″W	1124399	Upload Photo
The Old Quaker House and Garden Wall	Hedgerley	House	16th century	23 September 1955	SU9694187453; 51°34′39″N 0°36′09″W	1317834	Upload Photo
Bridgefoot House	Iver	House	Early 18th century	23 September 1955	TQ0408981362; 51°31′18″N 0°30′04″W	1332738	Upload Photo
Dairy in Grounds of Elk Meadows	Iver	Cottage Ornee	Early 19th century	26 April 1985	TQ0396482968; 51°32′10″N 0°30′09″W	1164777	Upload Photo
Iver Grove	Shreding Green, Iver	House	1722-1724	27 November 1954	TQ0240681107; 51°31′11″N 0°31′32″W	1124384	Iver Grove More images
Entrance Gates, Lamps and Lodges to Stoke Park	Stoke Poges	Gate Lodge	c. 1800	26 April 1985	SU9746682332; 51°31′53″N 0°35′47″W	1124347	Entrance Gates, Lamps and Lodges to Stoke Park More images
Gray's Monument	Stoke Poges	Sarcophagus	1799	23 September 1955	SU9778782667; 51°32′04″N 0°35′30″W	1124346	Gray's Monument More images
Stoke Park Bridge	Stoke Park, Stoke Poges	Bridge	1798	23 September 1955	SU9727382636; 51°32′03″N 0°35′56″W	1124358	Stoke Park Bridge More images
Balustrade from the Villa Borghese, Rome, to the South of Cliveden	Taplow	Balustrade	1618	23 September 1955	SU9103585125; 51°33′28″N 0°41′18″W	1332434	Balustrade from the Villa Borghese, Rome, to the South of Cliveden More images
Shell Fountain, Cliveden	Cliveden, Taplow, South Bucks	Shell Fountain	1897	26 April 1985	SU9108385565; 51°33′42″N 0°41′15″W	1125047	Shell Fountain, Cliveden More images
Stable Buildings at Cliveden	Cliveden, Taplow	Loggia	1861	23 September 1955	SU9096785266; 51°33′32″N 0°41′21″W	1125043	Upload Photo
Langley Park including Quadrant Walls, Corner Towers, Pavilions and Orangery.	Langley Park, Wexham	Apartment	1983	18 July 1972	TQ0090981591; 51°31′27″N 0°32′49″W	1125028	Langley Park including Quadrant Walls, Corner Towers, Pavilions and Orangery. More images
Parish Church of St Mary	Wexham, South Bucks	Parish Church	12th century	26 April 1985	SU9927181512; 51°31′26″N 0°34′14″W	1309053	Parish Church of St Mary More images
