= Basil Ward =

New Zealand architect

- Born: 22 July 1902; Hawke's Bay, New Zealand
- Died: 1976 (aged 73–74); England
- Occupation: Architect
- Practice: Connell, Ward and Lucas
- Buildings: Usherwood

Basil Robert Ward (22 July 1902 – 1976) was an architect born in Hawke's Bay, New Zealand who, with his partners Amyas Connell and Colin Lucas, pioneered modernist architecture in England.

== Life ==
Basil Ward was articled to James Hay in Napier, New Zealand from 1918 to 1923. In 1924, with Amyas Connell, he worked his passage to England to further his architectural studies. In 1926–27 he was on a scholarship in Rome. In 1928 he married Beatrix Connell (Amyas Connell's sister; Connell married Maud Hargreaves, Ward's sister) and from then until 1930 worked in Rangoon in the Foster & Ward partnership. At the end of 1930 he returned to England and joined the Connell partnership just as High and Over was nearing completion.

After dissolution of the Connell, Ward and Lucas partnership in 1939 following the outbreak of war, Ward served in the British Royal Navy, then became a partner in Ramsey, Murray, White and Ward. From 1953 to 1956 he was Lethaby professor of architecture at the Royal College of Art in London, later becoming head of the school of architecture at Manchester College of Art and Design (which subsequently amalgamated with the College of Commerce and John Dalton College of Technology to become Manchester Polytechnic) and lecturing at Lancaster University.

== Connell, Ward and Lucas ==
Connell and Ward formed the Connell, Ward and Lucas architectural practice in London with the English architect Colin Lucas in May 1934. The partners worked separately and carried out a small but highly significant body of work including modernist private houses (notably 66 Frognal), flats and a film studio. Ward's particular contributions were The Concrete House, Westbury-on-Trym (with Connell 1934–35) and Usherwood, Sutton Abinger, Surrey (1934–35).

== Sources ==
- Sharp, Dennis; Rendel, Sally (2008). Connell Ward and Lucas: Modern movement architects in England 1929–1939. London: Frances Lincoln. ISBN 978-0-7112-2768-2.
- "Basil Ward – Biography". London: The Paul Mellon Centre for Studies in British Art.
