= Amersham Meeting House =

Meeting house in Buckinghamshire, England

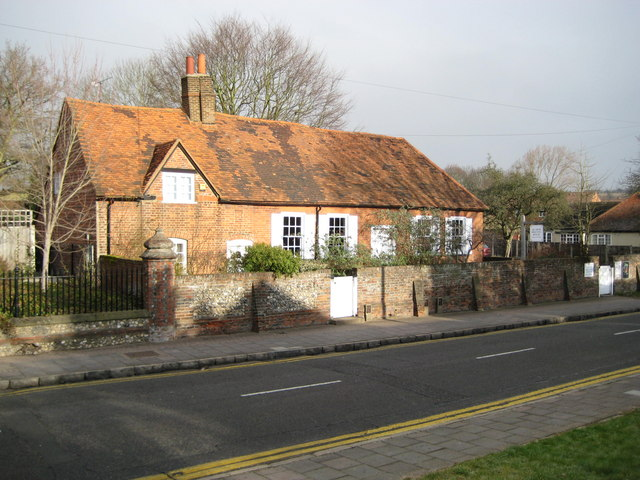
- The building in 2008

- Location within Buckinghamshire

General information
- Type: Friends meeting house
- Location: Whielden Street, Amersham, Buckinghamshire, England
- Coordinates: 51°39′51″N 0°37′08″W
- Year built: 1689
- Renovated: Late 18th century (added)

Website
- caqm.org.uk/amersham

Listed Building – Grade II*
- Official name: Friends' Meeting House and Whielden Cottage
- Designated: 22 December 1958
- Reference no.: 1274183

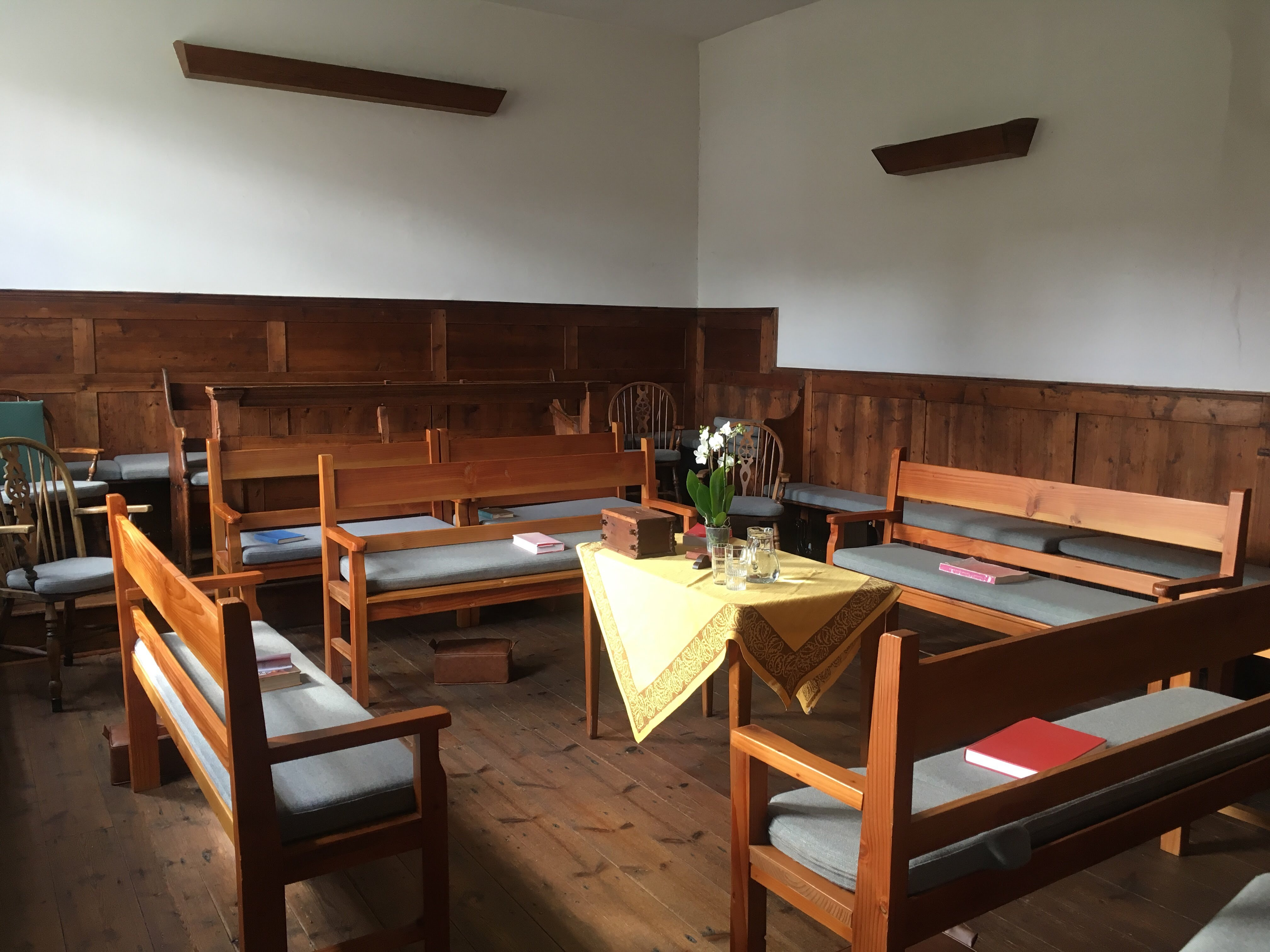
The meeting room of Amersham Meeting House in 2017

The Amersham Meeting house is a Friends meeting house (a Quaker place of worship) on Whielden Street in Amersham, a market town in the Chiltern Hills of Buckinghamshire, England. It is listed at Grade II* on the National Heritage List for England. Meeting for worship is held on Sundays at 11 am.

The meeting house forms part of an extension to the adjoining Whielden Cottage, which was built around 1600. The cottage was enlarged in 1689 to serve as a meeting house for the Quakers, who had begun to meet in Amersham from the 1660s. The Amersham Quakers received a letter from the early Quaker Isaac Penington in 1667.

The building was further extended and refronted in red brick in the late 18th century. The meeting room is divided into two by a wooden screen with shutters. A large burial ground lies to the north and west of the house.

The library of the Amersham Quakers is registered on LibraryThing.

== See also ==
- Grade II* listed buildings in Chiltern
