= Forty Green, Penn =

Hamlet in the parish of Penn, Buckinghamshire, England

Coordinates: 51.616°N 0.664°W

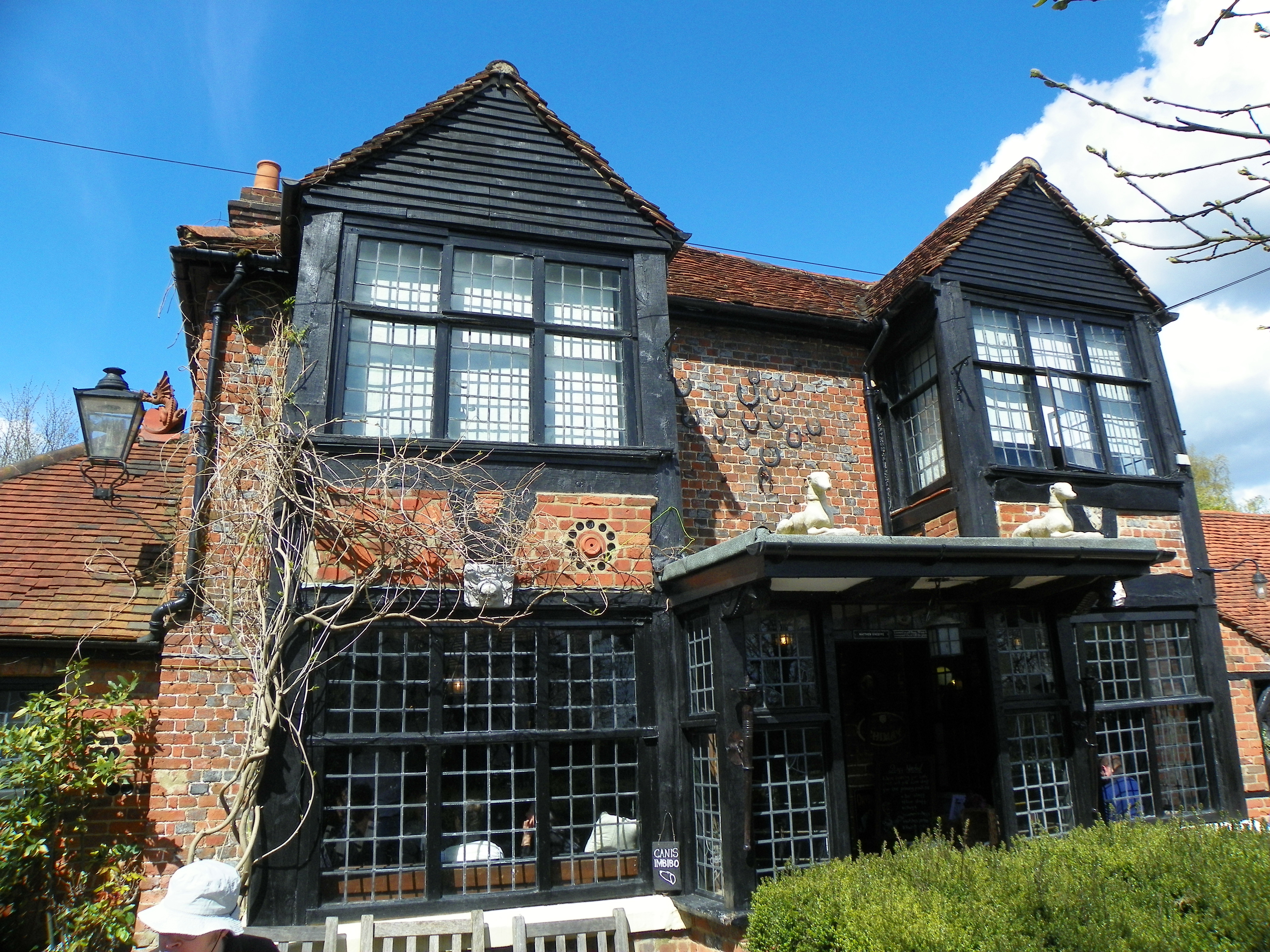
The Royal Standard of England pub

Forty Green is a hamlet in the parish of Penn in Buckinghamshire, England. It is located in the Chiltern Hills near Beaconsfield and Knotty Green.

== The Royal Standard of England ==
The Royal Standard of England is a pub in Forty Green. It is reputedly the Oldest Freehouse in England, dating as far back as 1100. Known as The Ship from 1213 to 1663, it adopted its current name when the restored monarch Charles II allowed the name change as a reward for offering the supporters of his father, Charles I, a safe haven during the English Civil War; hence the name of one of the rooms within the establishment, the Lower King Charles room. Charles II is thought to have stayed at the inn with a mistress. A popular filming location, TV Afterlife 3 by Ricky Gervais and it has appeared in several films such as Hot Fuzz and The Theory of Everything. UK's best-selling author of the 1990s, Terry Pratchett, grew up in Forty Green
