= Penn, Buckinghamshire =

Village in Buckinghamshire, England

Coordinates: 51°37′59″N 0°40′52″W

Penn
- Village and civil parish
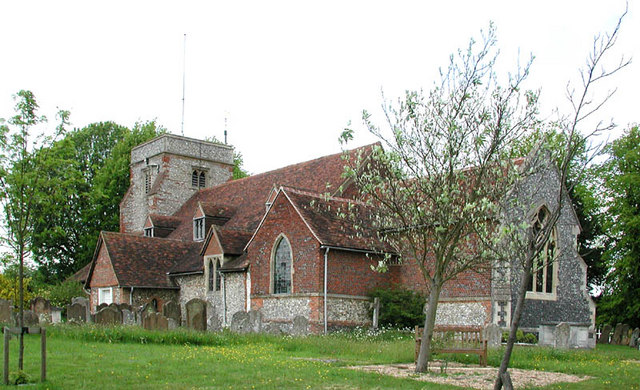
- Holy Trinity parish church

- Location within Buckinghamshire
- Population: 3,961 (2011 Census including Tylers Green)
- OS grid reference: SU912935
- Unitary authority: Buckinghamshire
- Ceremonial county: Buckinghamshire
- Region: South East
- Country: England
- Sovereign state: United Kingdom
- Post town: High Wycombe
- Postcode district: HP10
- Dialling code: 01494
- Police: Thames Valley
- Fire: Buckinghamshire
- Ambulance: South Central
- UK Parliament: Wycombe

Penn is a village and civil parish in Buckinghamshire, England, about 3 miles (4.8 km) north-west of Beaconsfield and 4 miles (6.4 km) east of High Wycombe. The parish's 3,991 acres (1,615 ha) cover Penn village and the hamlets of Tylers Green, Penn Street, Knotty Green, Forty Green and Winchmore Hill. The population was estimated at 4,168 in 2019.

== History ==
The name is Brittonic in origin, comparable with the modern Welsh typonym pen, and may mean "hill top" or "end". Penn stands on a strong promontory of the Chiltern Hills. From the tower of Holy Trinity Parish Church, it is claimed to be possible to see into several other counties.

== Penn family ==
Segraves Manor, the principal seat in Penn, belonged to the Penn family. Sybil Penn, wife of David, was dry nurse and foster mother to King Edward VI and Lady of the Bed Chamber to his sister, Queen Elizabeth I.

The Penn estate directly benefited from the Slave Compensation Act of 1837. The family owned two plantations in Jamaica and a total of 210 individuals split between the Clarendon and the Oak plantations. The estate was awarded a total of £4,095, the equivalent of half a million pounds today.

The Penn family of Penn were not known to be related to William Penn (after whose father, Admiral Sir William Penn, Pennsylvania is named), whose family came from Wiltshire. In 1735 the manor of Penn passed from the unmarried Roger Penn to his sole heir and sister, who was married to the 3rd Baronet Scarsdale, an ancestor of the Lords Curzon. Penbury Grove House was built in 1902 by the American engineer Horace Field Parshall as a replica of Pennsbury Manor, William Penn's house in Pennsylvania, Parshall wrongly thinking that these Penns shared a connection with Pennsylvania.

== Myth ==
Penn is reputedly haunted by the ghost of an 18th-century farm labourer, who appears laughing, on a phantom horse.

== Commons and sports ==
Penn Street, Knotty Green and Forty Green are hamlets in the parish, each within a mile of the main village.

Penn Street and Knotty Green have village commons, where the Penn Street and Knotty Green cricket clubs play. The local public houses, The Squirrel in Penn Street and The Red Lion in Knotty Green, face their respective commons. Forty Green also has a pub – The Royal Standard of England. Penn has a non-League football club, Penn & Tylers Green F.C., which plays at Elm Road.

== Penn today ==
The area is part of the Chiltern Hills and popular with people who commute to London due to its proximity to road junction 3 of the M40 motorway at Loudwater, mainline rail at Beaconsfield and London Underground at Amersham, both linked with the city.

Penn remains home to Earl Howe of the Penn-Curzon-Howe dynasty, which gained more wealth through the Inclosure Acts, which gave legal property rights to land previously in communal use. In 1855, ownership of Common Wood and Penn Wood passed to the 1st Earl Howe, forcing many local people and their livestock off the land. This caused general unrest within the community. For centuries, villagers had sustained themselves by grazing their animals on the common and gathering what they could from the land. When the woods became private property, many were plunged further into poverty. Years of unlawful protest followed, when poaching was rife and fences were pulled down as local people tried to retrieve what they deemed legitimately theirs.

Penn Street churchyard contains items from Gopsall, Lord Howe's other country house in Leicestershire. The lychgate and Countess Howe memorial were moved from Congerstone in 1919, when the family sold the Gopsall Estate.

== Notable people ==
- The novelist Elizabeth Taylor died in Penn in 1975.
- Medical pioneers Dr Louisa Garrett Anderson (1873–1943), her partner Dr Flora Murray and the children's writer Alison Uttley, author of the Little Grey Rabbit stories, are buried in the churchyard of Holy Trinity.
- The actor and singer Stanley Holloway lived in Penn with his wife and son for many years in the 1950s and 1960s.
- The countertenor Michael Chance was born in the village.
- The renowned Scottish preacher Alexander Whyte (1836–1921) spent his last months in the village and preached his last sermon at the Free Methodist Chapel in Church Road.
- Thomas Horder, 1st Baron Horder, physician to the royal family (as was Bertrand Dawson, 1st Viscount Dawson of Penn, who chose the village for the territorial designation of his peerage) lived in the village for several years.
- David Blakely, murdered by Ruth Ellis, lived on Hammersley Lane with his parents. Ellis was the last woman to be judicially executed in Britain.
- Canadian author Margaret Laurence (1926–1987) lived in Elm Cottage on Beacon Hill in 1963–1973. It had been previously owned by the politician Sir Donald Maclean and Lady Maclean, parents of the Soviet spy Donald Maclean.
- The princesses Sophia Duleep Singh (suffragette) and Catherine Hilda Duleep Singh (1876–1948), daughters of the Maharaja Duleep Singh (1871–1942) and Bamba Müller, lived in Penn during World War II and hosted children evacuated from London as well as German Jewish refugees.
- Food writer and TV chef Mary Berry (born 1935) lived in Penn for over 30 years up to 2019.
- The philosopher Karl Popper made Penn his home after moving to the UK from New Zealand in 1946
- In 1947, the ashes of novelist Elizabeth von Arnim and her brother, Sir Sydney Beauchamp, were mingled in the churchyard of St Margaret's, Tylers Green, Penn.
