= Amersham Market Hall =

Municipal building in Amersham, Buckinghamshire, England

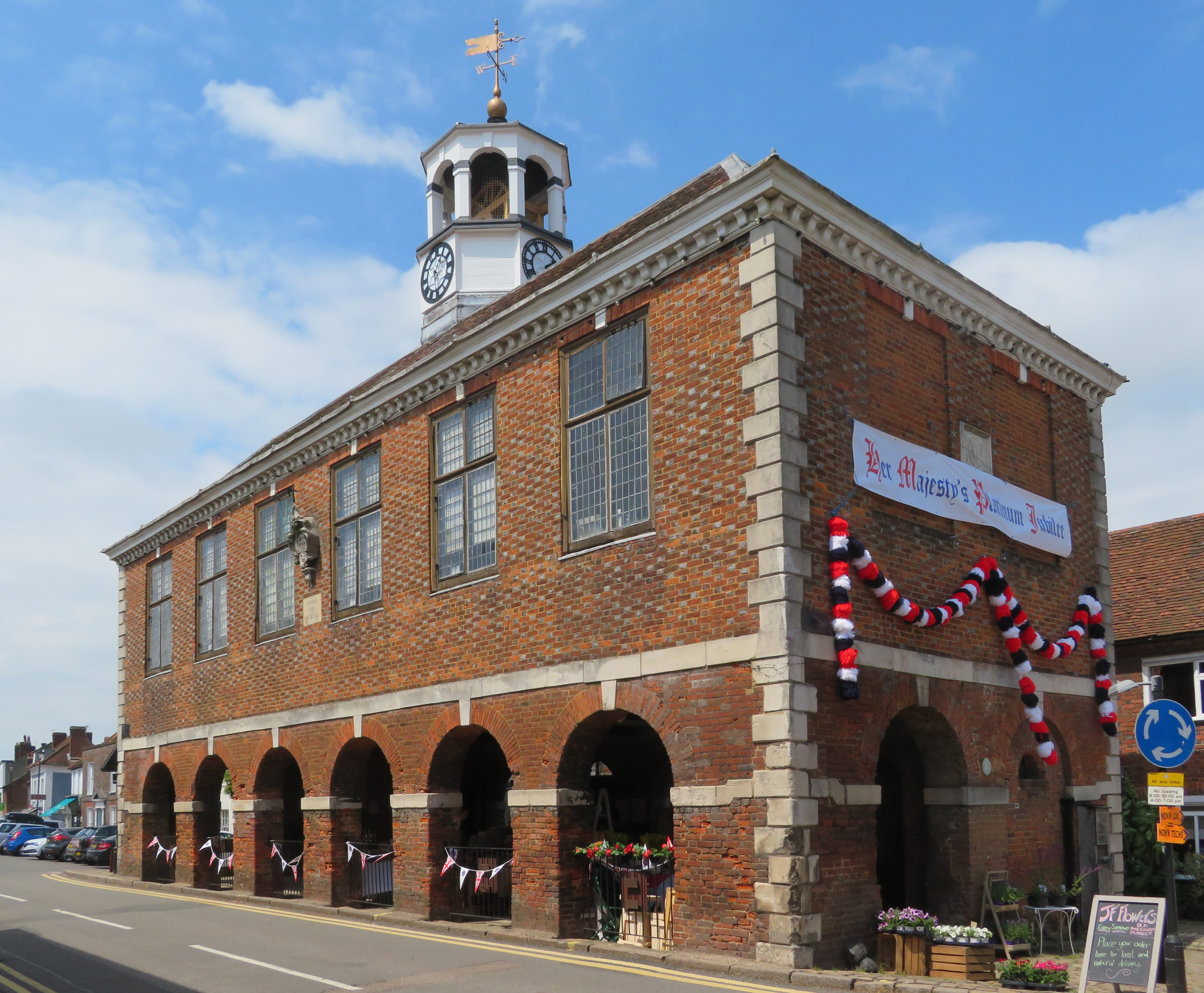
- Amersham Market Hall

- Shown in Buckinghamshire
- 51.6665°N 0.6169°W
- Location: High Street, Amersham

History
- Built: 1682

Site notes
- Architectural style: Neoclassical style

Listed Building – Grade II*
- Official name: Market Hall
- Designated: 22 December 1958
- Reference no.: 1221420

Amersham Market Hall, formerly known as Amersham Town Hall, is a municipal building in the High Street in Amersham, Buckinghamshire, England. The structure is a Grade II* listed building.

== History ==
The town received a royal charter, allowing it to hold markets, from King John in 1200. For several centuries the market took the form of a series of stalls in an area which extended from the High Street in the west to Broadway in the east until a medieval market hall was erected in Broadway in the early 17th century. A series of seditious papers were posted in the building in 1653. After the old structure became dilapidated, the local member of parliament, Sir William Drake, who lived at Shardeloes, decided to construct a more substantial market building for the benefit of the town: the site he selected was in the High Street, to the west of the original building.

The new building was designed in the neoclassical style, built in red brick with stone dressings and was completed in 1682. It was arcaded on the ground floor so that markets could be held, with an assembly room on the first floor. The design involved a symmetrical main frontage with six bays facing onto the south side of the High Street: this elevation featured a row of casement windows on the first floor with a coat of arms of the Drake family in the centre. There were quoins at the corners, a modillioned cornice at roof level and an octagonal wooden cupola above. An inscription stated that the bell in the cupola was manufactured by a Christopher Hudson. A village lock-up for petty criminals was installed in the north-east corner of the building at an early stage, a water pump was erected in 1785 and a horse-drawn fire station was installed in the arcaded area in the late 19th century. Trade guild meetings, school classes, magistrates' court hearings and political meetings were all held in the assembly room.

When parish and district councils were established under the Local Government Act 1894, the building became the meeting place for Amersham Parish Council, with the council's first meeting being held there on 4 January 1895. At this time the building was known as "Town Hall". The building was restored in 1911 at the expense of the then lord of the manor, William Wykeham Tyrrwhitt-Drake, and a plaque, bearing the inscription "Restored 1911 W. W. T. D." was installed below the coat of arms on the High Street elevation.

It was used as a recruiting station for Kitchener's Army at the start of the First World War. Amersham Police Court was held in the building until 1934.

The building was used by the BBC as a filming location for its comedy series, Cuckoo, in 2013.

== See also ==
- Grade II* listed buildings in Chiltern
