= James Gambier, 1st Baron Gambier =

Royal Navy officer and colonial administrator (1756–1833)

Admiral of the Fleet The Right Honourable The Lord Gambier GCB
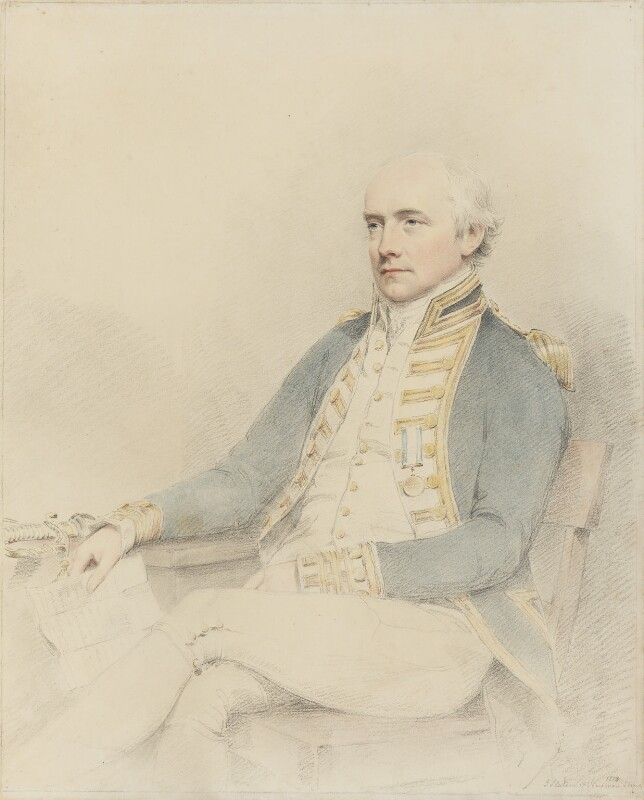
- Portrait by Joseph Slater Jr., 1813
- Nickname: Dismal Jimmy
- Born: 13 October 1756; New Providence, The Bahamas
- Died: 19 April 1833 (aged 76) Iver, Buckinghamshire
- Buried: St. Peter's churchyard in Iver
- Allegiance: Great Britain; United Kingdom
- Branch: Royal Navy
- Service years: 1767–1833
- Rank: Admiral of the Fleet
- Commands: HMS Thunder; HMS Raleigh; HMS Endymion; HMS Defence
- Conflicts: American Revolutionary War; French Revolutionary and Napoleonic Wars
- Awards: Knight Grand Cross of the Order of the Bath

Viceregal styles of The Lord Gambier
- Reference style: His Excellency
- Spoken style: Your Excellency

Admiral of the Fleet James Gambier, 1st Baron Gambier, GCB (13 October 1756 – 19 April 1833) was a Royal Navy officer and colonial administrator. After seeing action at the capture of Charleston during the American Revolutionary War, he saw action again, as captain of the third-rate HMS Defence, at the battle of the Glorious First of June in 1794, during the French Revolutionary Wars, gaining the distinction of commanding the first ship to break through the enemy line.

Gambier went on to be a Lord Commissioner of the Admiralty and First Naval Lord and then served as Governor of Newfoundland. Together with General Lord Cathcart, he oversaw the bombardment of Copenhagen during the Napoleonic Wars. He later survived an accusation of cowardice for his inaction at the Battle of the Basque Roads.

== Early career ==
Born the second son of John Gambier, the Lieutenant Governor of the Bahamas and Bermudian Deborah Stiles, Gambier was brought up in England by his aunt, Margaret Gambier, and her husband, Admiral Charles Middleton, 1st Baron Barham. He was a nephew of Vice-Admiral James Gambier and of Admiral Lord Barham and became an uncle of the novelist and travel writer Georgiana Chatterton.

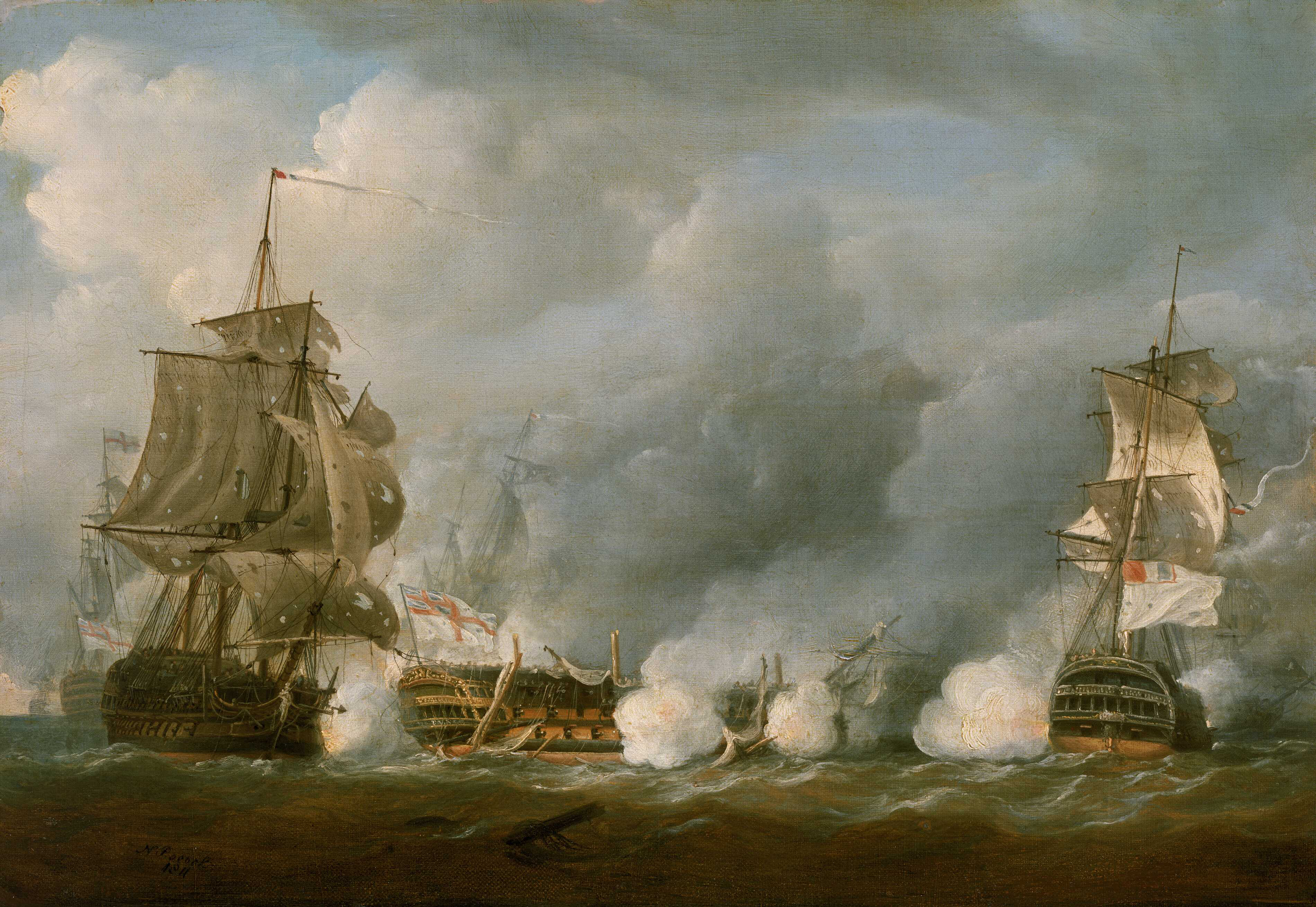
The third-rate HMS Defence, commanded by Gambier, at the Glorious First of June in 1794

Gambier entered the Navy in 1767 as a midshipman on board the third-rate HMS Yarmouth, commanded by his uncle, which was serving as a guardship in the Medway, and followed him to serve on board the 60-gun fourth-rate HMS Salisbury in 1769 where he served on the North American Station. He transferred to the 50-gun fourth-rate HMS Chatham under Rear Admiral Parry, in 1772, in the Leeward Islands. Gambier was placed on the sloop HMS Spy and was then posted to England to serve on the 74-gun third-rate HMS Royal Oak, a guardship at Spithead. He was commissioned as a lieutenant on 12 February 1777, in which rank he served successively in the sloop Shark, the 24-gun frigate HMS Hind, the third-rate HMS Sultan under Vice-Admiral Lord Shuldham, and then in HMS Ardent under his uncle's flag.

Lord Howe promoted Gambier to commander on 9 March 1778 and gave him command of the bomb ship HMS Thunder, which was promptly dismasted and surrendered to the French. He was taken prisoner for a short period and, after having been exchanged, he was made a post captain on 9 October 1778 and appointed to the 32-gun fifth-rate HMS Raleigh and saw action at the capture of Charleston in May 1780 during the American Revolutionary War. He was appointed commander of fifth-rate HMS Endymion, cruising in British waters, later in the year. In 1783, at the end of the War, he was placed on half-pay.

In February 1793 following the start of the French Revolutionary Wars, Gambier was appointed to command the 74-gun third-rate HMS Defence under Lord Howe. By faith an evangelical, he was regarded as an intensely religious man, nicknamed Dismal Jimmy, by the men under his command. As captain of the Defence Gambier saw action at the battle of the Glorious First of June in 1794, gaining the distinction of commanding the first ship to break through the enemy line and subsequently receiving the Naval Gold Medal.

== Senior command ==
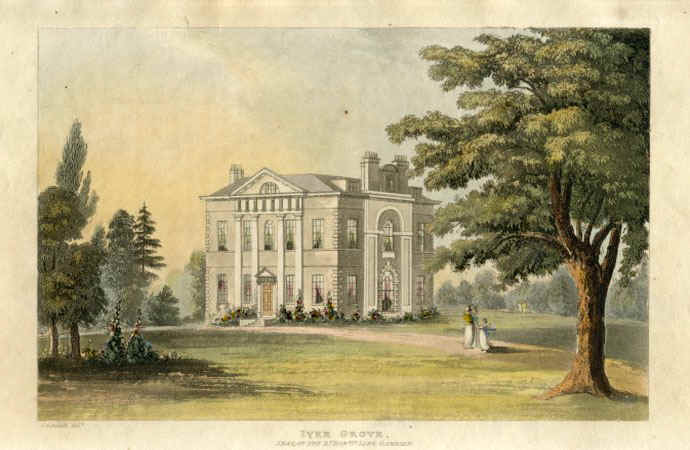
Iver Grove, Gambier's home in Buckinghamshire

Gambier was appointed to the Board of Admiralty led by Earl Spencer in March 1795. Promoted to rear-admiral on 1 June 1795, he became First Naval Lord in November 1795. Promoted to vice-admiral on 14 February 1799, Gambier left the Admiralty after the fall of the first Pitt ministry in February 1801 and became third-in-command of the Channel Fleet under Admiral William Cornwallis, with his flag in the 98-gun second-rate HMS Neptune. He went on to be governor and commander-in-chief of Newfoundland Station in March 1802. In that capacity he gave property rights over arable land to local people allowing them to graze sheep and cattle there and also ensured that vacant properties along the shore could be leased to local people. It was around that time that he also bought Iver Grove in Buckinghamshire.

Gambier then returned to the Admiralty as a Lord Commissioner of the Admiralty and First Naval Lord on the Admiralty Board led by Viscount Melville when the second Pitt ministry was formed in May 1804. Promoted to full admiral on 9 November 1805, Gambier left the Admiralty in February 1806. He returned briefly for a third tour as First Naval Lord on the Admiralty Board led by Lord Mulgrave when the Second Portland Ministry was formed in April 1807.

In May 1807 Gambier volunteered to command the naval forces, with his flag in the second-rate HMS Prince of Wales, sent as part of the campaign against Copenhagen during the Napoleonic Wars. Together with General Lord Cathcart, he oversaw the bombardment of Copenhagen from 2 September until the Danes capitulated after three days (an incident that brought Gambier some notoriety in that the assault included a bombardment of the civilian quarter). Prizes included eighteen ships of the line, twenty-one frigates and brigs and twenty-five gunboats together with a large quantity of naval stores for which he received official thanks from Parliament, and on 3 November 1807 a peerage, becoming Baron Gambier, of Iver in the County of Buckingham.

== Battle of the Basque Roads ==
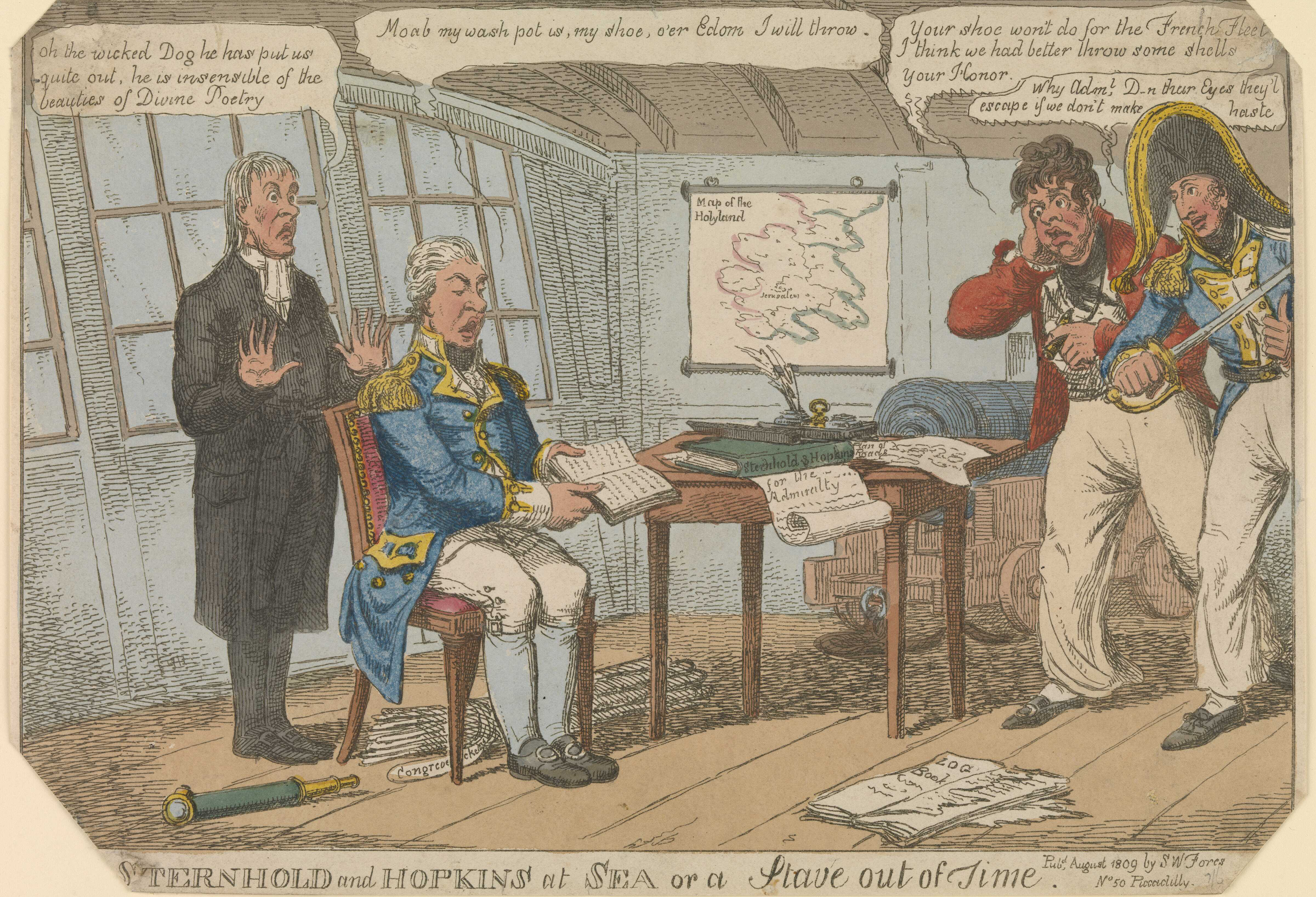
Cartoon mocking Gambier's refusal to support Lord Cochrane at the Battle of the Basque Roads

In 1808 Gambier was appointed to command the Channel Fleet. In April 1809 he chased a squadron of French ships that had escaped from Brest into the Basque Roads. He called a council of war in which Lord Cochrane was given command of the inshore squadron, and who subsequently led the attack. Gambier refused to commit the Channel Fleet after Cochrane's attack, using explosion vessels that encouraged the French squadron to warp further into the shallows of the estuary. This action resulted in the majority of the French fleet running aground at Rochefort.

Gambier was content with the blockading role played by the offshore squadron. Rear-Admiral Sir Eliab Harvey, who had commanded "Fighting Temeraire" at the Battle of Trafalgar, believed they had missed an opportunity to inflict further damage upon the French fleet. He told Gambier "I never saw a man so unfit for the command of a fleet as Your Lordship." Cochrane threatened to use his parliamentary vote against Gambier in retaliation for not committing the fleet to action. Gambier called for a court martial to examine his conduct. The court martial, on 26 July 1809 on Gladiator in Portsmouth, exonerated Gambier. Consequently, neither Harvey nor Cochrane were appointed by the Admiralty to command for the remainder of the war. The episode had political and personal overtones. Gambier was connected by family and politics to the Tory prime minister William Pitt. In Parliament, Cochrane represented the constituency of Westminster, which tended to vote Radical. In the aftermath of Basque Roads, Cochrane and Gambier quarreled and Gambier excluded Cochrane from the battle dispatches. Cochrane took the unusual move of standing in opposition to parliament's pro forma vote of thanks to Gambier.

== Later career ==
In 1814 Gambier was part of the team negotiating the Treaty of Ghent, ending the War of 1812 between Britain and the United States. He was appointed a Knight Grand Cross of the Order of the Bath on 7 June 1815. Promoted to Admiral of the Fleet on 22 July 1830, he died at his home, Iver Grove in Buckinghamshire, on 19 April 1833 and was buried at St. Peter's churchyard in Iver.

== Legacy ==
Gambier was a founding benefactor of Kenyon College in the United States, and the town that was founded with it, Gambier, Ohio, is named after him, as is Mount Gambier, the city and dormant volcano in South Australia, and Gambier Island in British Columbia, as well as the Gambier Islands in French Polynesia. Gambier appears as a minor character near the end of Flying Colours, a 1938 Horatio Hornblower novel by C. S. Forester.

== Personal life ==
In July 1788 Gambier married Louisa Mathew, daughter of Daniel Mathew, 1718–1777, of Felix Hall, Kelvedon, Essex and St Kitts, West Indies, and Mary Elizabeth Byam, 1729–1814; they had no children.

== Arms ==
Coat of arms of James Gambier, 1st Baron Gambier
Crest Out of a naval crown Or an eagle displayed Erminois charged on the breast with an anchor Sable. Escutcheon Erminois a fess wavy Azure between three starlings Sable beaked and legged Gules. Supporters Dexter a sailor habited Proper supporting a cross calvary Gules, sinister a female figure representing Hope vested Argent zoned Gules mantle Azure fringed Or on her breast the sun in splendour Gold her sinister hand resting upon an anchor Sable. Motto Fide Non Armis

== See also ==
- List of governors of Newfoundland and Labrador
- List of people from Newfoundland and Labrador

== Sources ==
- Blake, Richard (2008). Evangelicals in the Royal Navy, 1775–1815: Blue Lights and Psalm-singers. The Boydell Press. ISBN 978-1843833598.
- Forester, Cecil (2011) [1938]. Flying Colours. Penguin. ISBN 978-0-241-95549-9.
- Gannett, Henry (1905). The Origin of Certain Place Names in the United States. Government Printing Office. p. 134.
- Grant, James (1803). The narrative of a voyage of discovery, performed in His Majesty's vessel the Lady Nelson, of sixty tons burthen: with sliding keels, in the years 1800, 1801, and 1802, to New South Wales. C. Roworth for T. Egerton. ISBN 978-0-7243-0036-5.
- Hall, Christopher David (1992). British Strategy in the Napoleonic War, 1803–15. Manchester University Press. ISBN 978-0719036064.
- Hattendorf, John B. (2023). "Admiral of the Fleet James, First Baron Gambier, G.C.B" in Reflections on Naval History. Naval War College Press. ISBN 978-1-935352-81-5.
- Heathcote, Tony (2002). The British Admirals of the Fleet 1734–1995. Pen & Sword. ISBN 0-85052-835-6.
- Rodger, N.A.M. (1979). The Admiralty. Offices of State. Lavenham: T. Dalton Ltd. ISBN 0900963948.
- Tracy, Nicholas (2006). Who's Who in Nelson's Navy: Two Hundred Heroes. Chatham Publishing. ISBN 978-1861762443.
- Walbran, Captain John T. (1971). British Columbia Place Names, Their Origin and History (Facsimile reprint of 1909 ed.). Vancouver/Toronto: Douglas & McIntyre. ISBN 0-88894-143-9. Archived from the original on 3 March 2016.

Government offices
Preceded by Sir Charles Morice Pole	Commodore Governor of Newfoundland; 1802–1804	Succeeded by Sir Erasmus Gower
Military offices
Preceded by Sir Charles Middleton	First Naval Lord; 1795–1801	Succeeded by Sir Thomas Troubridge
Preceded by Sir Thomas Troubridge	First Naval Lord; 1804–1806	Succeeded by John Markham
Preceded by John Markham	First Naval Lord; 1807–1808	Succeeded by Sir Richard Bickerton
