= Holly Mount, Knotty Green =

Coordinates: 51.62738°N 0.65523°W

Holly Mount (originally Hollymount) is a detached house in Knotty Green in Buckinghamshire. It was designed by the English architect C.F.A. Voysey and was built between 1904 and 1907. It has been listed Grade II* on the National Heritage List for England since October 1973.
