= Amyas Connell =

New Zealand architect (1901–1980)

Amyas Douglas Connell
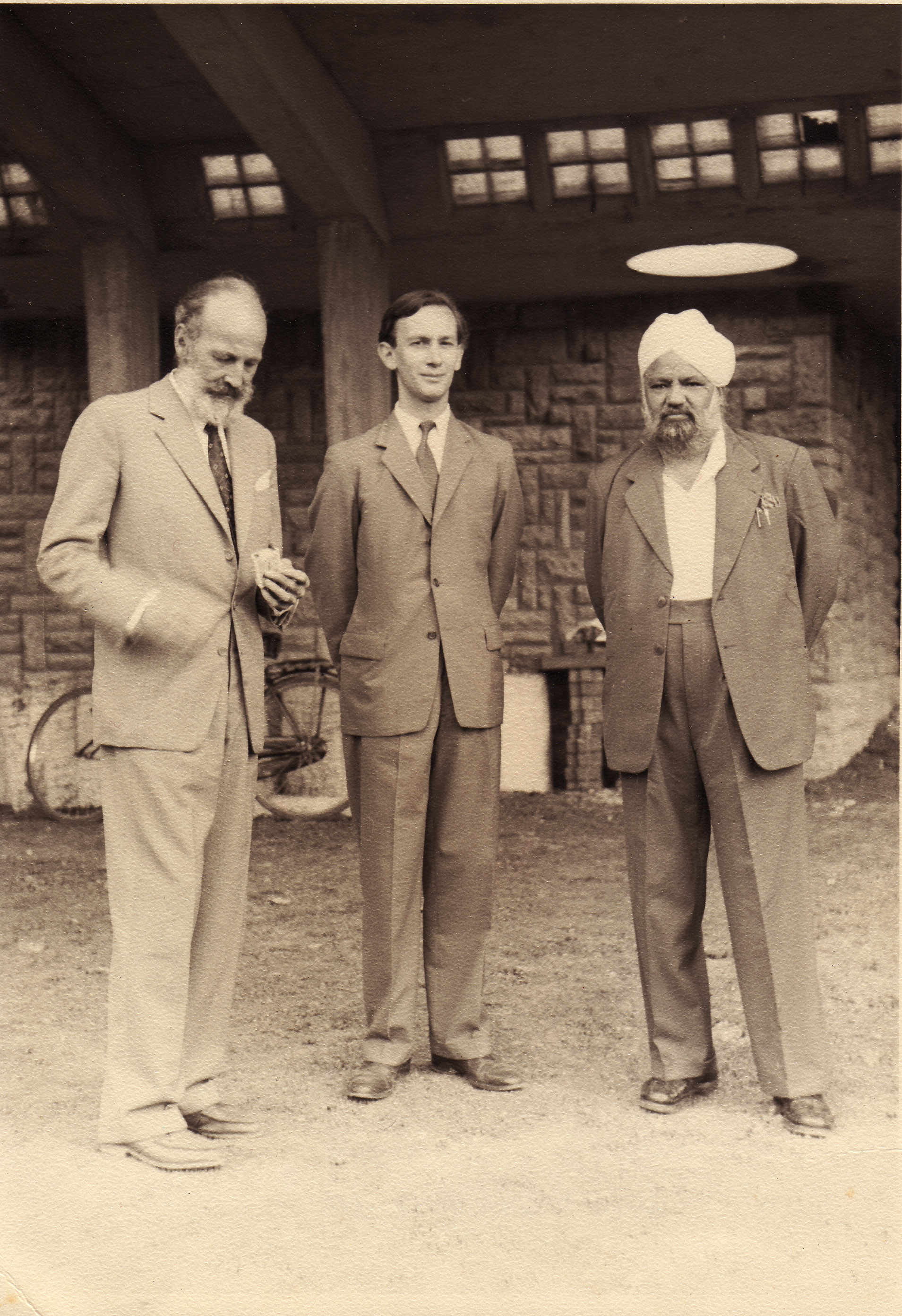
- Connell (far left) in 1965
- Born: 23 June 1901; Eltham, New Zealand
- Died: 19 April 1980 (aged 78); London, England
- Occupation: Architect
- Practice: Connell and Thomson, Connell, Ward and Lucas
- Buildings: High and Over, 1929; New Farm, 1932

Amyas Douglas Connell (23 June 1901 – 19 April 1980) was a highly influential New Zealand architect of the mid-twentieth century. He achieved early and conspicuous success as a student, winning the British Prix de Rome in Architecture in 1926. Having been impressed by the work of Le Corbusier at the 1925 Paris Exhibition and that of fellow French Modernists André Lurçat and Robert Mallet-Stevens, Connell effectively launched the Modernist architectural style in Great Britain.

== Biographical background ==
Born in Eltham, in South Taranaki District, New Zealand, in 1901, Connell was raised in an artistic household that was somewhat exotic in small town New Zealand terms. His father, Nigel Douglas (Dido) Connell, ran a photographic studio and taught pastel drawing. His mother Gertrude (Weber) was of German descent. His home town in the fertile farming region of Taranaki was in the middle of a building boom remarkable for the early use of reinforced concrete to construct dairy factories and commercial buildings. Connell was trained in Wellington in the office of Stanley W. Fearn, a neo-classical designer who was the recipient of the first New Zealand Institute of Architects Gold Medal. After leaving the Rome School early in 1929, Connell set up a London office with the young Australian architect Stewart Lloyd Thomson (1902–1990) and began work on High and Over.

== High and Over (1929–1931) ==
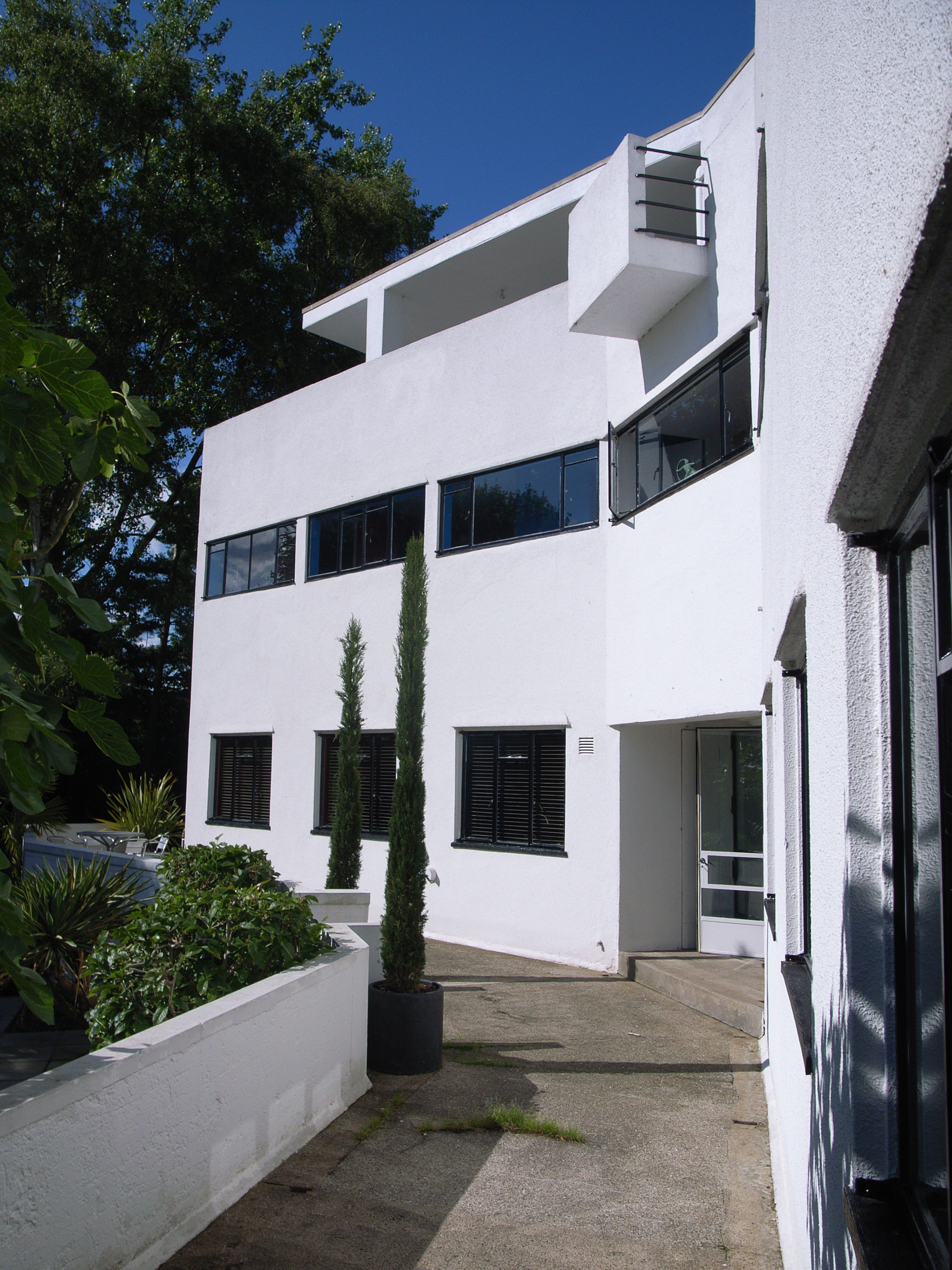
'High and Over', photographed in 2009

High and Over is a country house in Amersham, Buckinghamshire designed for (and in close collaboration with) the noted archaeologist Professor Bernard Ashmole, later to become director of the British Museum. The house was completed in 1931. Built with a reinforced concrete frame in the shape of a letter 'Y', High and Over is amongst the first Modernist houses in Britain. While it is correct to attribute the design to Connell, plans for the house carry the joint names of Connell and Thomson. It is a Grade II* listed building.

The house is situated on a prominent hillside with views over the old town of Amersham and the Misbourne Valley on land that was originally part of the estate of the Tyrwhitt-Drake Family who lived at the nearby Shardeloes. The house was part of a larger scheme that included a gardener's lodge, water tower and generator house set in a garden that combined Cubist elements with the English landscape tradition. It was later joined by a group of speculative houses in similar style - the "Sun Houses".

In this early and impressive design, Connell utilises his deep understanding of Roman architecture in a complex reworking of Corbusean modernism, attempting a fusion that would connect the classical and modern worlds. While some British critics interpreted this as muddled formalism, it was a beacon to a younger generation of architects including Alison and Peter Smithson. In 1931 British Pathe produced a short film about High and Over in its recently completed state, entitled "The house of a dream". The film is introduced with "For centuries houses have been built to meet the needs of each age. Today, we dream of houses open to sun and air, embodying everything that modern science can offer", and features shots of the interior and exterior (B/W). The house also appears in the 1973 BBC documentary by Sir John Betjeman, Metro-land.

In 1962, it was divided into two separate dwellings in a (successful) effort to save it from demolition. In the 1960s a large part of the grounds of the house were sold off to developers and the drive was re-used to make an adopted road, Highover Park, serving approximately 50 1960s detached, semi-detached and town houses. This later, albeit still modernist, development had no connection to Connell. These houses and other in-fill developments around High and Over since the mid 20th Century have affected the house's immediate environment and aspects, and new developments still generate considerable public attention and protest about their impact on High and Over. Although the house was divided into two apartments in 1962, it was later converted back into a single dwelling. It was then placed on the market for sale at £2.5m (May 2010), and returned to the market at £2.8m in 2014.

== Connell, Ward and Lucas (1933–1939) ==
After cutting ties with Thomson, Connell established a partnership with his brother-in-law Basil Ward (a fellow New Zealander) and, later, Colin Lucas, to form the Connell, Ward Lucas architectural practice in 1933. The partners worked separately and carried out a small but significant body of work including private houses, flats and a film studio. Early highlights include the radical fan-shaped house called New Farm for Sir Arthur Lowes Dickinson in 1932. New Farm, designed by Connell, was a more thorough synthesis of modernist planning and construction where irregularly shaped concrete floor slabs supported on thin columns radiated out from a glazed stair tower. With its large areas of glass, daring cantilevers and thin reinforced concrete walls, it was arguably the boldest modernist house to have been built outside Europe at that time. Concrete House in Bristol and Kent House, a large block of low cost flats for the St Pancras Housing Society, followed in 1934, after which Connell's output was somewhat overshadowed by Ward and Lucas who succeeded in gaining commissions for increasingly large and complex private houses. 66 Frognal, their final commission (designed by Colin Lucas) was another cause célèbre and confirmed their reputation as architectural provocateurs, a role that Connell and Ward later enjoyed but one that embarrassed the modest Lucas. The breakup of the partnership left something of a rift between the New Zealanders and Lucas. In an effort to secure work, Connell entered the competition for the Auckland Cathedral (1940) and narrowly missed selection, gaining second prize with a Swedish style neo-classical plan. After World War II Connell established practices in Tanganyika and Kenya, designing a number of public and government buildings in Nairobi, before returning to the UK in 1977.

A complete list of Connell, Ward and Lucas projects is somewhat elusive. Incomplete lists appear in the references below and new work is still being identified. A previously unknown house designed by Connell in Guildford, Surrey has recently been documented by the UK Modern House Fanatics yahoo group.

== Connell and the British architectural scene ==
While an outsider by virtue of his New Zealand background, Connell formed part of a complex network of mainly foreign modernist architects and designers who exerted a strong influence in Britain between the wars. Tall, strong featured and bearded, Connell was an eloquent defender of Modernism. He robustly debated this subject with Sir Reginald Blomfield in For and Against Modern Architecture, a broadcast by BBC radio in 1934 that was also printed in The Listener. His apolitical and pragmatic position on architecture was regarded with suspicion by the more leftist element in the MARS Group, an organisation that included the Russian architect Berthold Lubetkin. The firm gained notoriety by submitting neo-classical designs to architectural competitions. This was regarded as a failure to live up to the principles of modernism. The firm was also dogged by the loss of a number of major commissions and the war put a stop to what work was available. A large block of flats and shops in St Johns Wood and Connell's post-war commission for the Edith Edwards Children’s Home at the Papworth Sanitorium were uncompleted. Lack of work caused financial hardship for his family. Despite this, he was well connected in the architectural circle of outsiders that dominated British design in the 1930s and was a friend of the Australian Raymond McGrath and the urbane Russian Serge Chermayeff. The work of Connell, Ward and Lucas was recognised by the RIBA with a Bronze Medal in 1964.

Connell's critical reputation has been reassessed in recent years. Long championed by English architect and writer Dennis Sharp, the work of Amyas Connell, along with Ward and Lucas, is moving away from an undeserved reputation as uncouth and colonial towards a more balanced summary that acknowledges his early appearance on the international modernist scene with a pair of houses that caught British architecture at a key point of change.

The firm was in the spotlight in 2004 when Greenside (1937), one of the small number of houses that they completed, was demolished unlawfully by the owner.

Connell died in London on 19 April 1980, aged 78.
