= Elmhurst, Great Missenden =

Building in Great Missenden, Buckinghamshire, England

Coordinates: 51.70581°N 0.70917°W

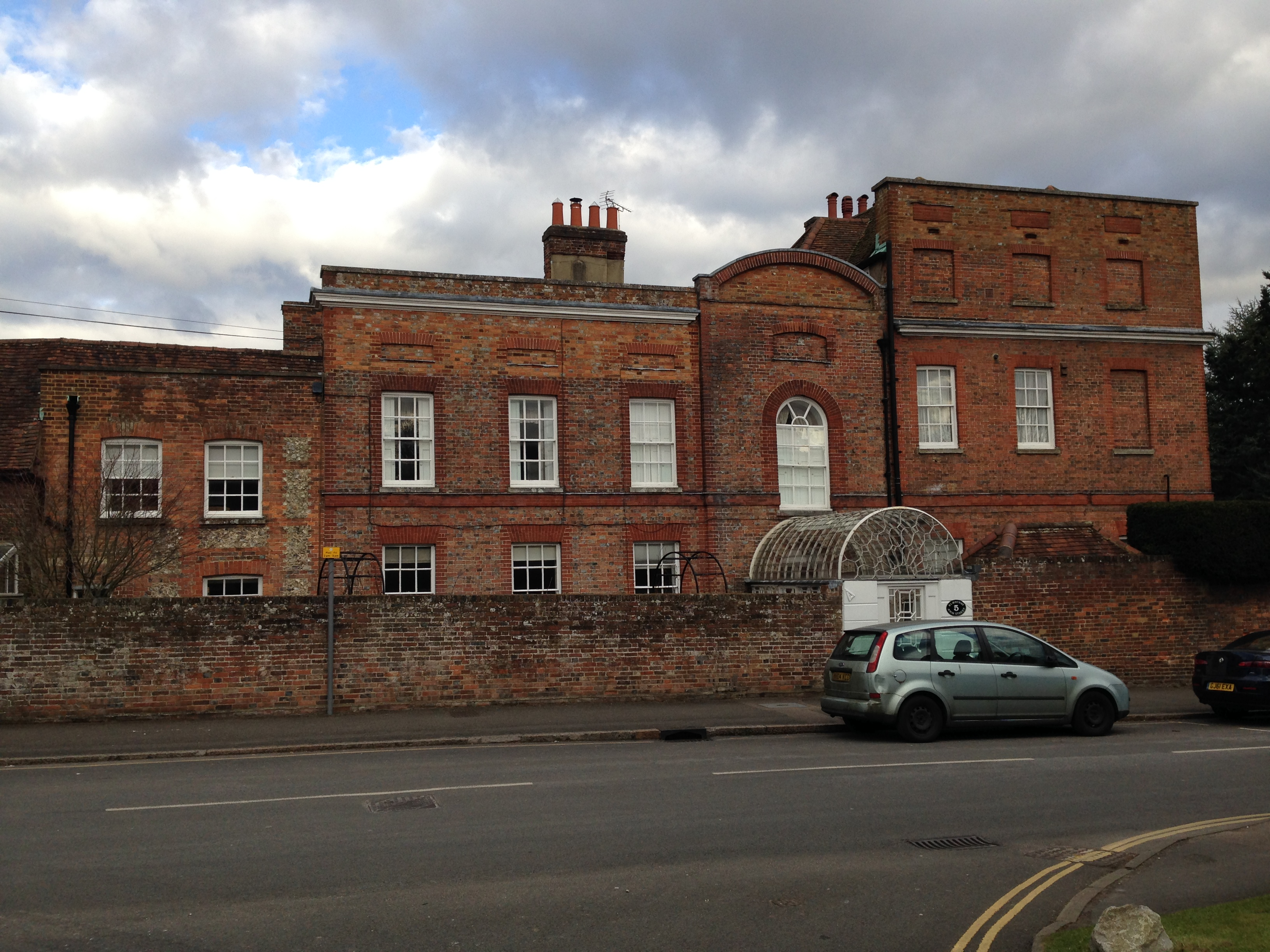
Elmhurst in March 2016

Elmhurst (also known as Elmtrees) is a semi-detached house at 5 High Street in Great Missenden, Buckinghamshire. It is divided into seven apartments. It predominantly dates from the 18th century and surrounds a 16th-century house.

The main wing has been listed Grade II* on the National Heritage List for England since August 1977. The north wing, known as Gable End, was separately listed Grade II in July 1984.

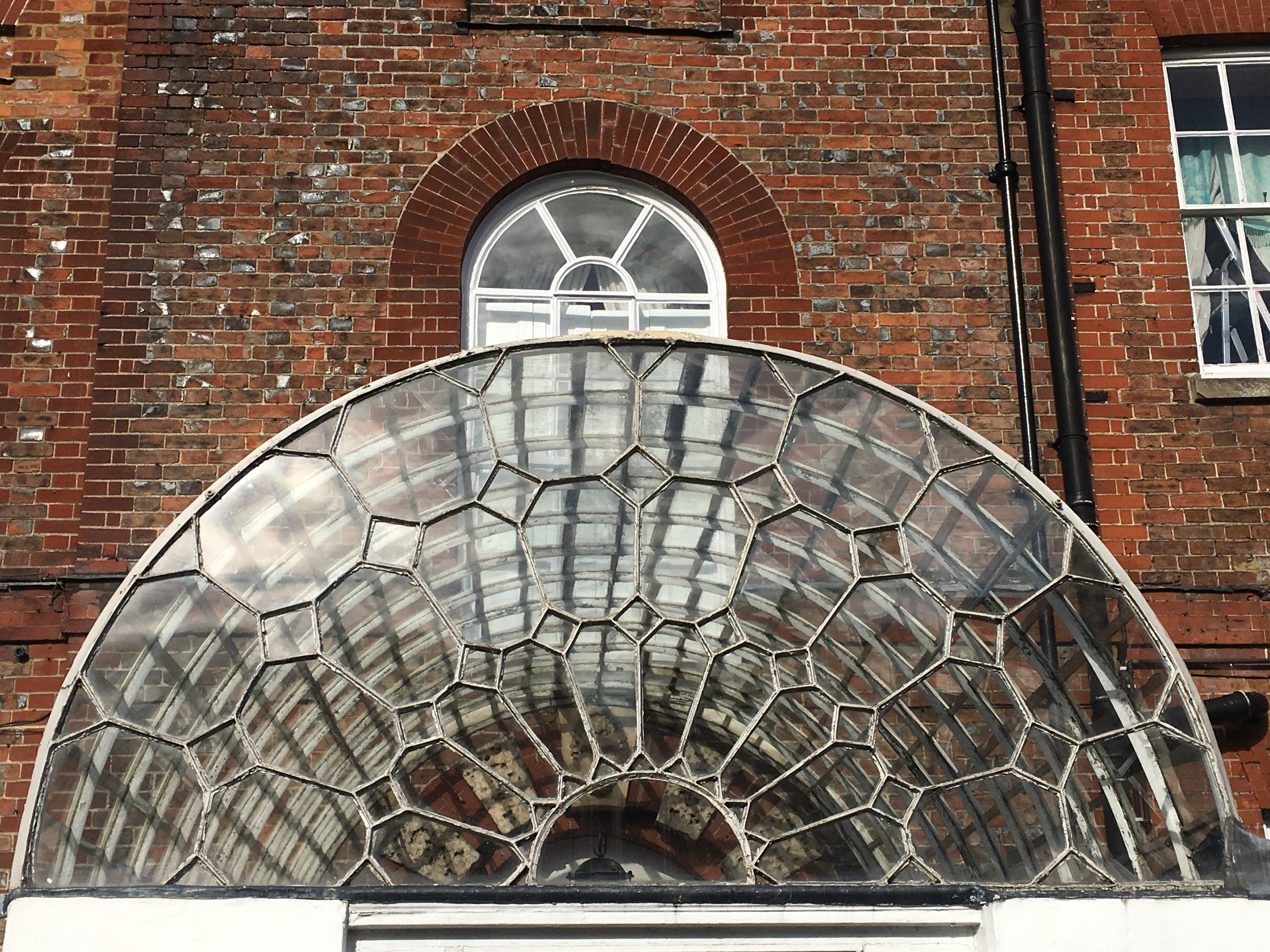
The distinctive glass fanlight above the entrance of Elmhurst in April 2017

The house is 2 storeys in height, made from red and grey brick and has a distinctive 19th century covered entrance with a semi circular iron roof and a traceried fanlight over the door.

The present house was erected by the Dormer family and was inhabited for several years by the widow of William Cleaver, the Bishop of Chester. It was subsequently the residence of Frances, the wife of the 19th century radical MP Robert Knight. A September 1840 letter from farmer John Burgess was sent from Elmhurst to the Journal of the Royal Agricultural Society of England. An 1870 letter from Gilbert William Child was sent from Elmhurst to Charles Darwin.
