= Iver Grove =

Coordinates: 51.51961°N 0.52545°W

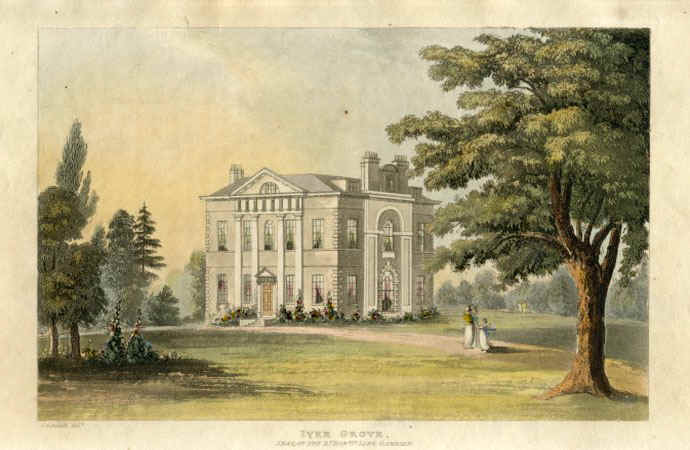
Iver Grove

Iver Grove is a country house in Iver in Buckinghamshire. It is a Grade II* listed building.

== History ==
The house, which was designed by John James in the Palladian style, was built for Lady Mohun and completed in 1724. It was acquired by Admiral Lord Gambier in 1802 at which time the garden was full of unusual pansies. After use as a Polish refugee camp during the Second World War, it fell into disrepair and was acquired by the Ministry of Works in 1957 and was subsequently restored. It was bought by Mr and Mrs James Howie Mitchell in 1961 and by Sir Tom Stoppard and his wife, Miriam Stoppard, in the 1970s and they sold it on again in 1997.
