= Hills House, Denham =

Coordinates: 51.5725°N 0.4972°W

Hills House
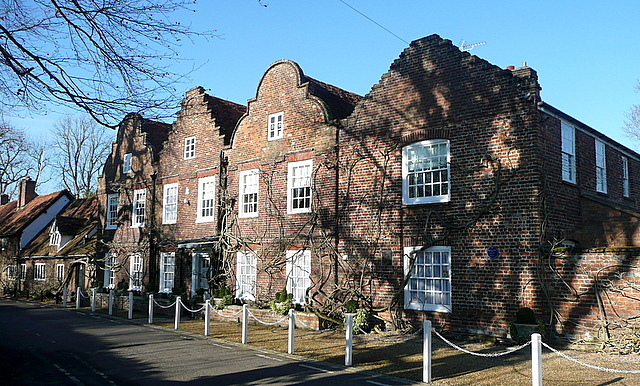
- Hills House
- Interactive map of the Hills House area

General information
- Type: Residential
- Architectural style: Netherlandish Classicism
- Location: Denham, Buckinghamshire

Technical details
- Structural system: Brick
- Floor count: 3

Hills House is a 17th-century residence located on the Village Road in Denham, Buckinghamshire, England. In the late 1930s and early 1940s, it was the home of actress Merle Oberon and her husband, the film producer Sir Alexander Korda. In 1975 the house was purchased by Sir John and Lady Mills.

== Description ==
The house is built of red brick with a tile roof. It has four gables facing the street, alternately shaped and stepped, and features three storeys. The sections of the house frontage differ. The left section has six double-hung, flush windows with glazing bars, flat brick arches and small brick cornice mouldings. The right section windows have cambered brick relieving arches. The ground floor has an entrance door with wooden architrave and hood on carved brackets. The gables have brick copings and the ground and first floor have brick bands. The interior is reported to feature a semi-circular recess with fluted pilasters and moulded cornice and newel staircase in oak. The exterior is partially covered with wisteria vine.

The house is listed as Grade II* on the National Heritage List for England. A plaque placed on the house by The Heritage Foundation commemorates Mills's residence.

== History ==
Alexander Korda (1893–1956) bought the house and estate at Denham for the sum of £15,000, planning to build film studios on the property. He managed to obtain permission for the construction and sent to California for architects to build the studios, Denham Film Studios, which opened in 1936 but suffered from financial difficulties. After Korda's marriage to film star Merle Oberon (1911–1979) in 1939, the couple lived in the house until their divorce in 1945. The area where the film studio stood, known as 'The Fisheries', is now a park.

Sir John Mills bought Hills House in 1975. However, the 4-acre (1.6 ha) garden and the house eventually became too large and the stairs too difficult for the elderly Sir John (1908–2005) and Lady Mills (1911–2005). In 2003 they moved from the house to a bungalow in the village of Denham.
