= Amersham =

Town in Buckinghamshire, England

Coordinates: 51°40′37″N 0°36′11″W

- Market town and civil parish
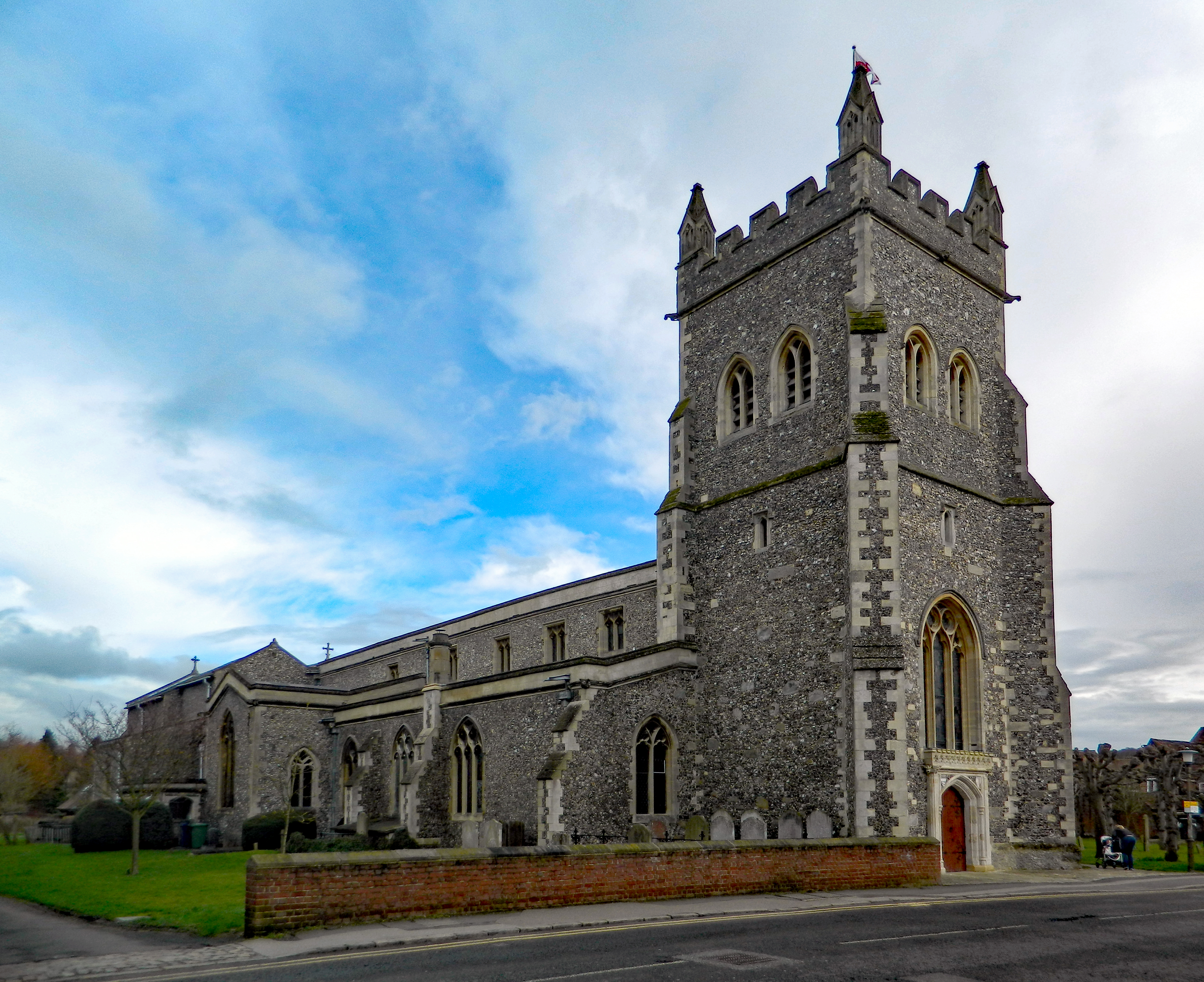
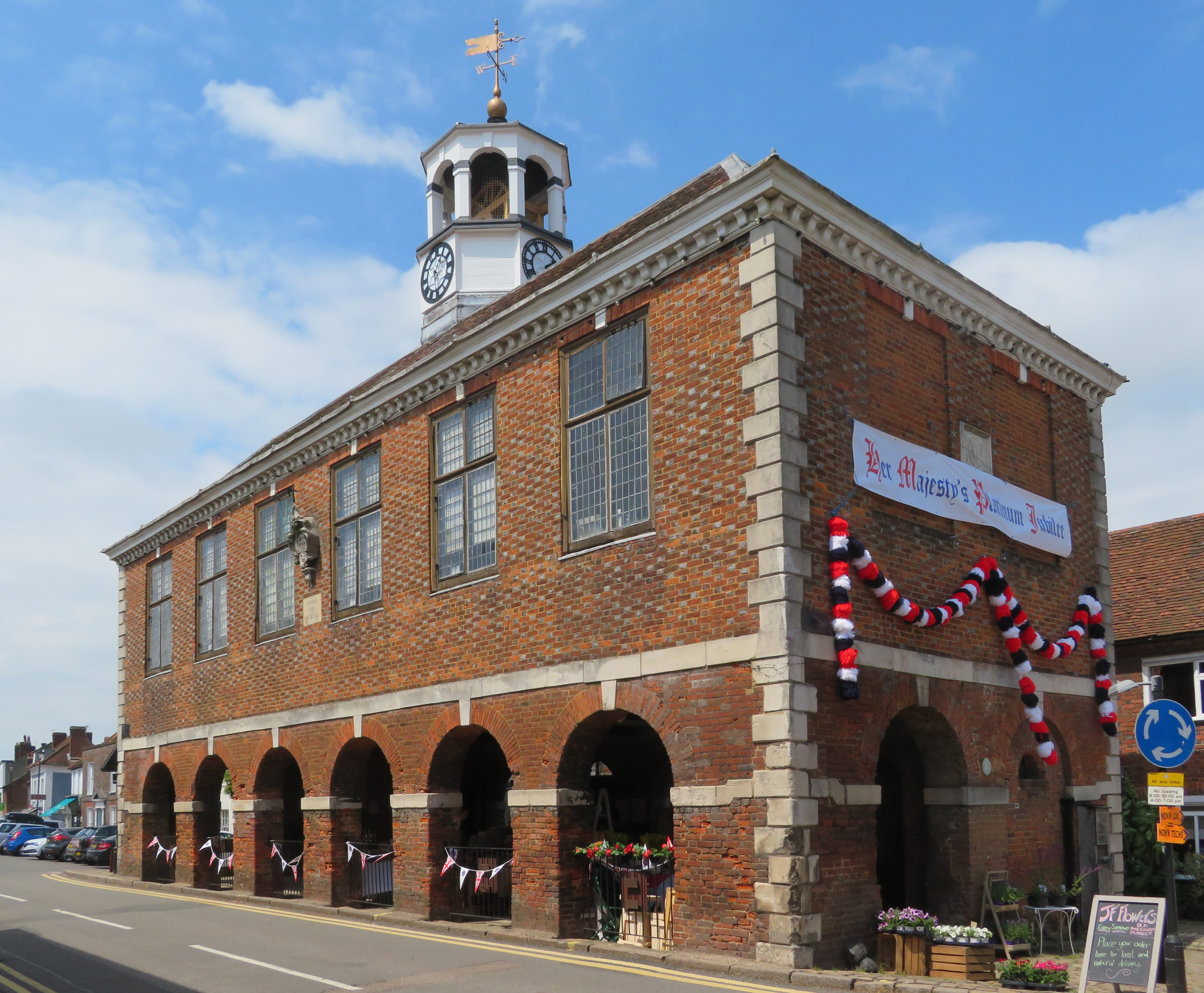
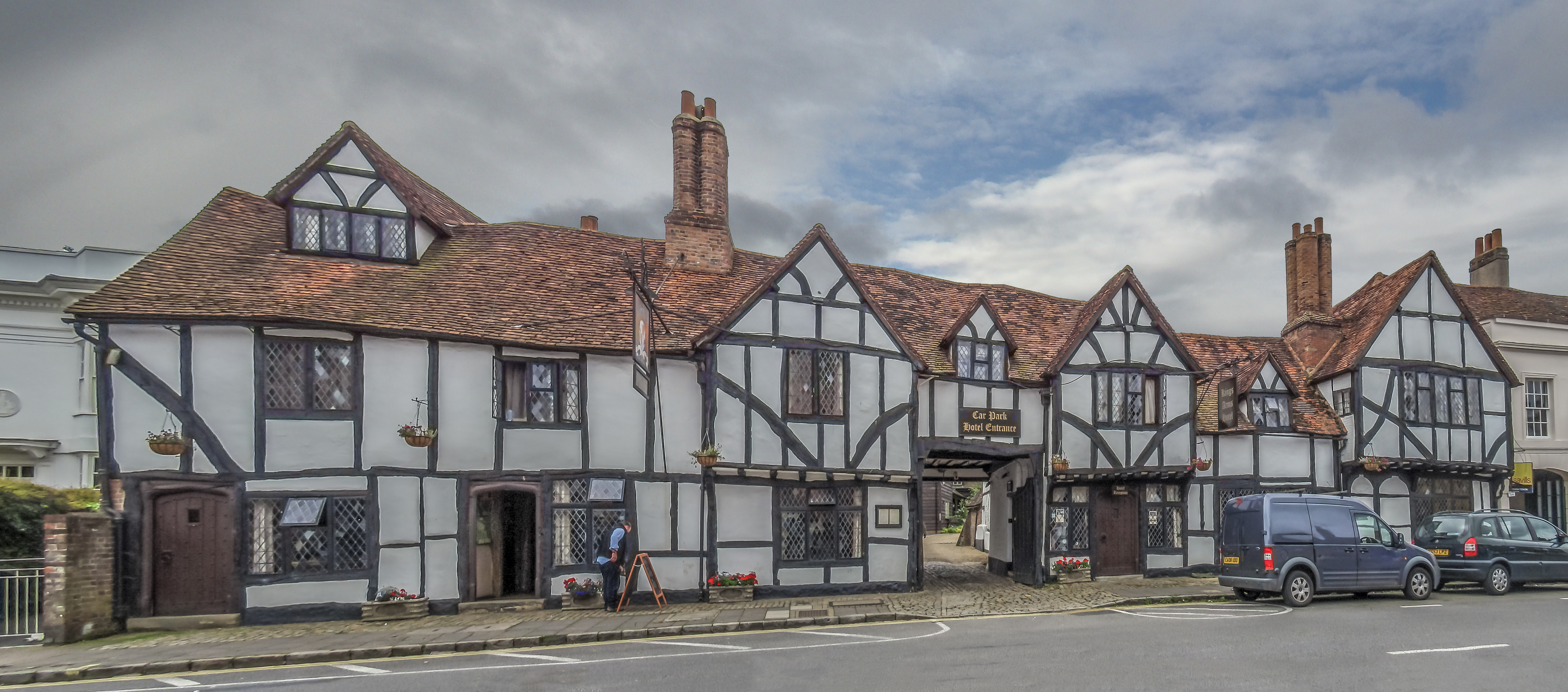
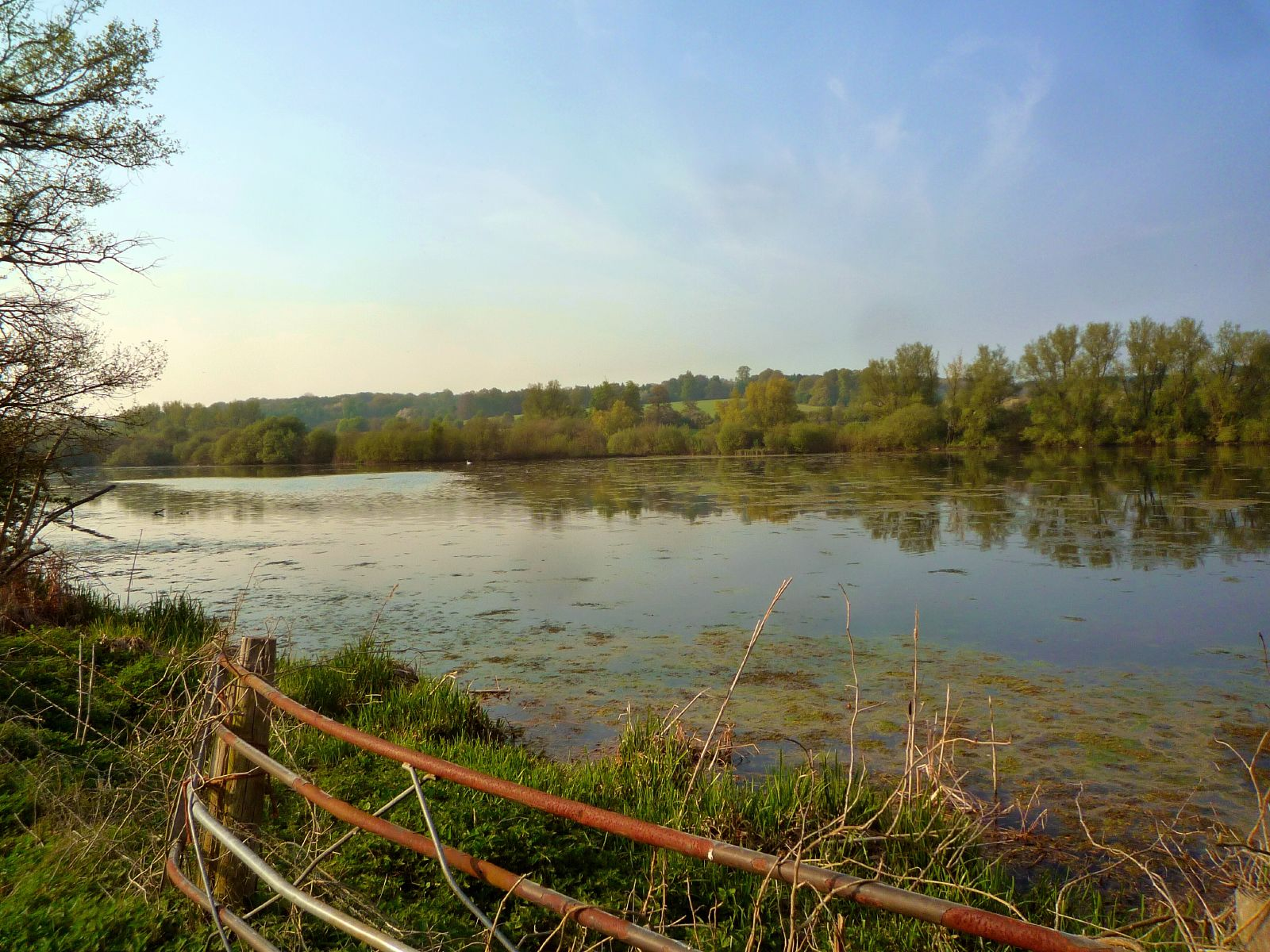
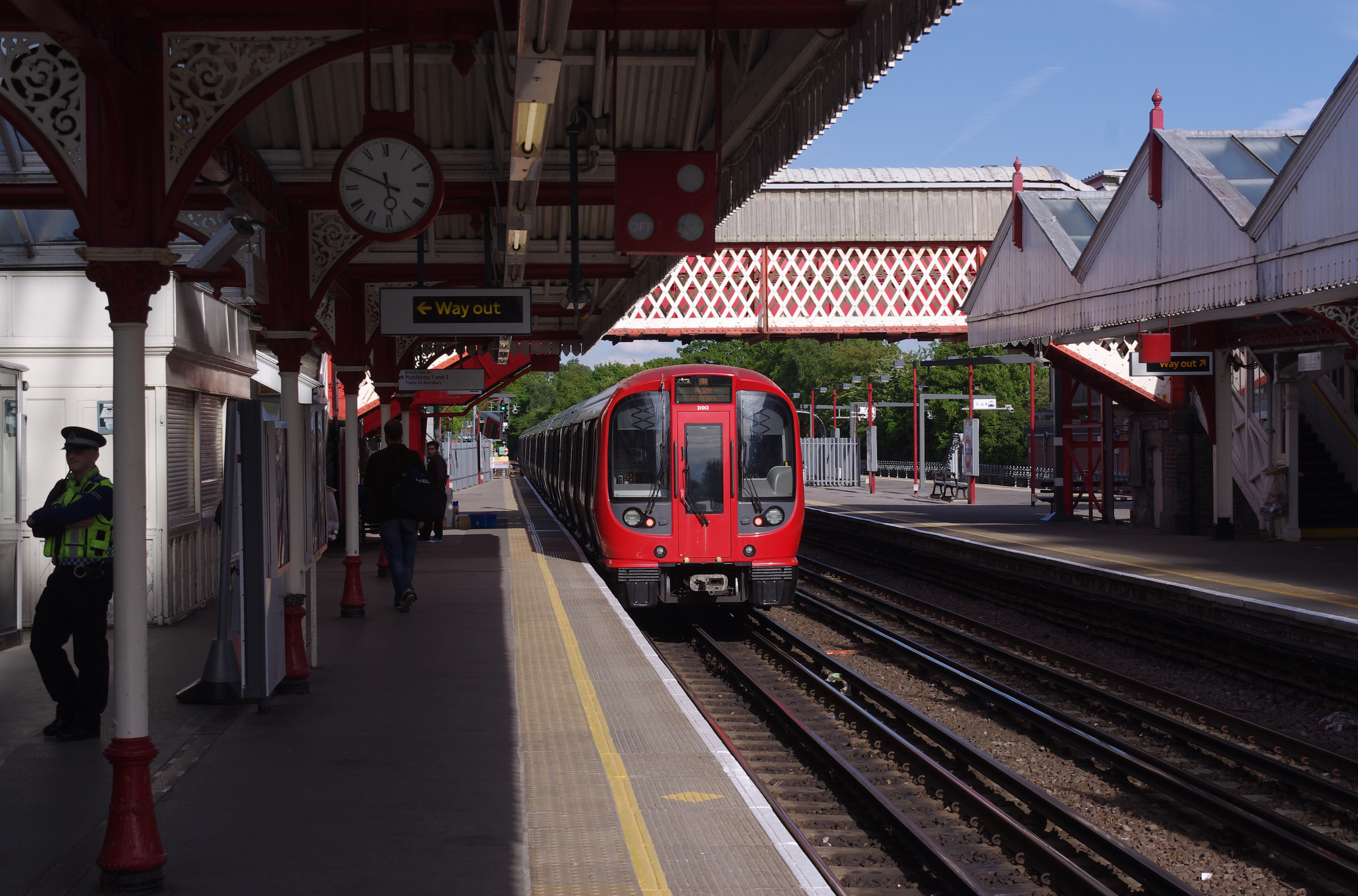
- St Mary's Church Market Hall The King's Arms Hotel Shardeloes Park Amersham Station

- Location within Buckinghamshire
- Population: 15,189 (2021 Census)
- OS grid reference: SU965985
- Unitary authority: Buckinghamshire
- Ceremonial county: Buckinghamshire
- Region: South East
- Country: England
- Sovereign state: United Kingdom
- Post town: AMERSHAM
- Postcode district: HP6, HP7
- Dialling code: 01494
- Police: Thames Valley
- Fire: Buckinghamshire
- Ambulance: South Central
- UK Parliament: Chesham and Amersham

Amersham (/ˈæmərʃəm/ AM-ər-shəm) is a market town and civil parish in the Chiltern Hills of Buckinghamshire, England, 27 miles (43 km) northwest of central London, 15 miles (24 km) south-east of Aylesbury and 9 miles (14 km) north-east of High Wycombe. Amersham is part of the London commuter belt.

There are two distinct areas:

- Old Amersham, set in the valley of the River Misbourne, containing the 13th-century parish church of St. Mary's and several old pubs and coaching inns
- Amersham-on-the-Hill, which grew in the early 20th century around Amersham station, which was served by the Metropolitan Railway (now the Metropolitan line) and the Great Central Railway.

== Geography ==
Old Amersham occupies the valley floor of the River Misbourne. This is a chalk stream which dries up periodically. The river occupies a valley much larger than it is possible for a river the size of the present River Misbourne to cut, which makes it a misfit stream. The valley floor is at around 100 m (330 ft) OD, and the valley top is at around 165 m (541 ft) OD. It is likely that the valley was formed under conditions akin to those required to form a dry valley. Amersham-on-the-Hill is built on the north side of the Misbourne valley on a small plateau that forms the watershed between the Misbourne and the neighbouring River Chess.

== History ==
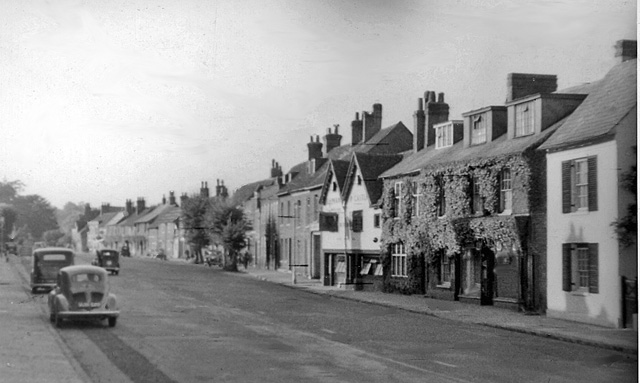
High Street, Old Amersham (1955)

The name "Amersham" is derived from the Old English for 'Ealhmund's village (hām)'.

Records date back to Anglo-Saxon times when it was known as Agmodesham, and by the time that the Domesday Book was written in 1086, it had become known as Elmodesham. Further spelling variations are seen in 1460 as Agmondysham and Amytysham

The Domesday entry reads:

Geoffrey de Mandeville holds Amersham. It answers for 7 1/2 hides. Land for 16 ploughs; in lordship 2 hides; 3 ploughs there. 14 villagers with 4 smallholders have 9 ploughs; a further 4 possible. 7 slaves; meadow for 16 ploughs; woodland 400 pigs. The total value is and was £9; before 1066 £16. Queen Edith held this manor.

Queen Edith was the wife of Edward the Confessor and sister of King Harold, and after her death in 1075, the land passed to William the Conqueror, who granted it to Geoffrey de Mandeville (died c. 1100).

In 1200, his descendant Geoffrey de Mandeville (who became the Earl of Essex in 1213) obtained a charter for Amersham allowing him to hold a Friday market and a fair on 7 and 8 September. In 1613, another charter was granted to Edward, Earl of Bedford, changing the market day to Tuesday, and establishing a statute fair on 19 September.

In 1521, seven Lollard dissenters (William Tylsworth, John Scrivener, Thomas Barnard, James Morden, Robert Rave, Thomas Holmes and Joan Norman) were burned at the stake in Amersham. A memorial to them was built in 1931 and is inscribed as follows: "In the shallow of depression at a spot 100 yards left of this monument seven Protestants, six men and one woman were burned to death at the stake. They died for the principles of religious liberty, for the right to read and interpret the Holy Scriptures and to worship God according to their consciences as revealed through God's Holy Word". The Universal Magazine for September 1749 (p. 139) quotes that 'William Tylesworth' was in fact burnt in 1506, and that Thomas Bernard and James Morden (a labourer), were burnt about two years later.

The population in 1841 was 3,098.

== Architecture ==
In 1931, the architect Amyas Connell completed the Grade II-listed art deco house "High & Over" in Amersham. It has been used as a filming location.

== Governance ==
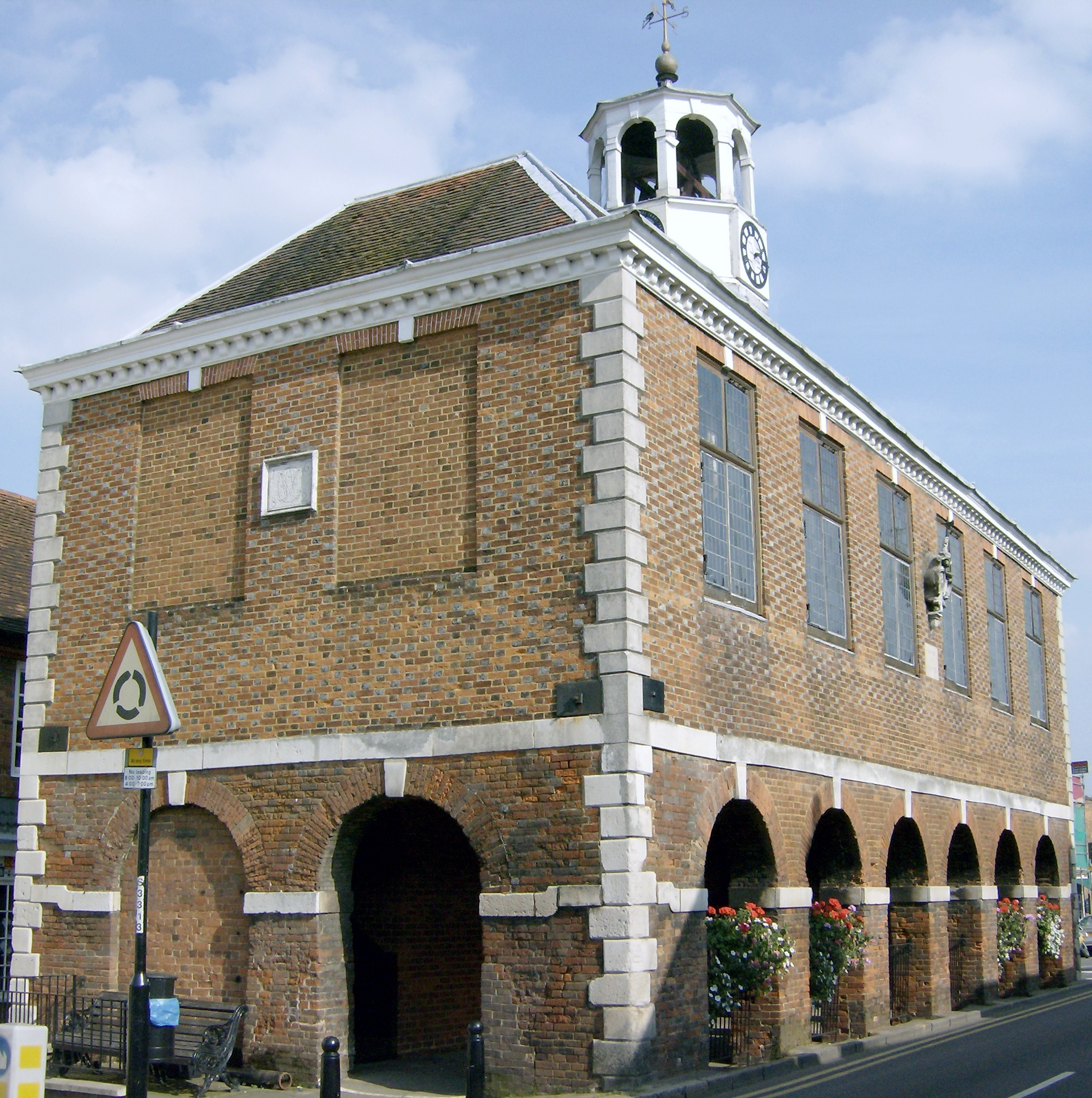
Amersham Market Hall

=== Parliamentary constituency ===
Amersham sent two Members of Parliament (MPs) to the unreformed House of Commons from 1625, and was considered a rotten borough until the Reform Act 1832 stripped it of its representation. The town was then part of the county constituency of Buckinghamshire. From 1885 it was in the Aylesbury constituency, in 1950 it formed part of the South Buckinghamshire seat and in 1974 the current Chesham and Amersham constituency was created. Since then Ian Gilmour (1974–1992) and then Cheryl Gillan (1992–2021) have represented the constituency on behalf of the Conservative party. In the 2019 General Election Ms Gillan was returned with 55.4% of the vote. After her death on 4 April 2021, the seat went to the Liberal Democrats for the first time since its creation when Sarah Green won the ensuing by-election on 17 June 2021.

=== Local government ===
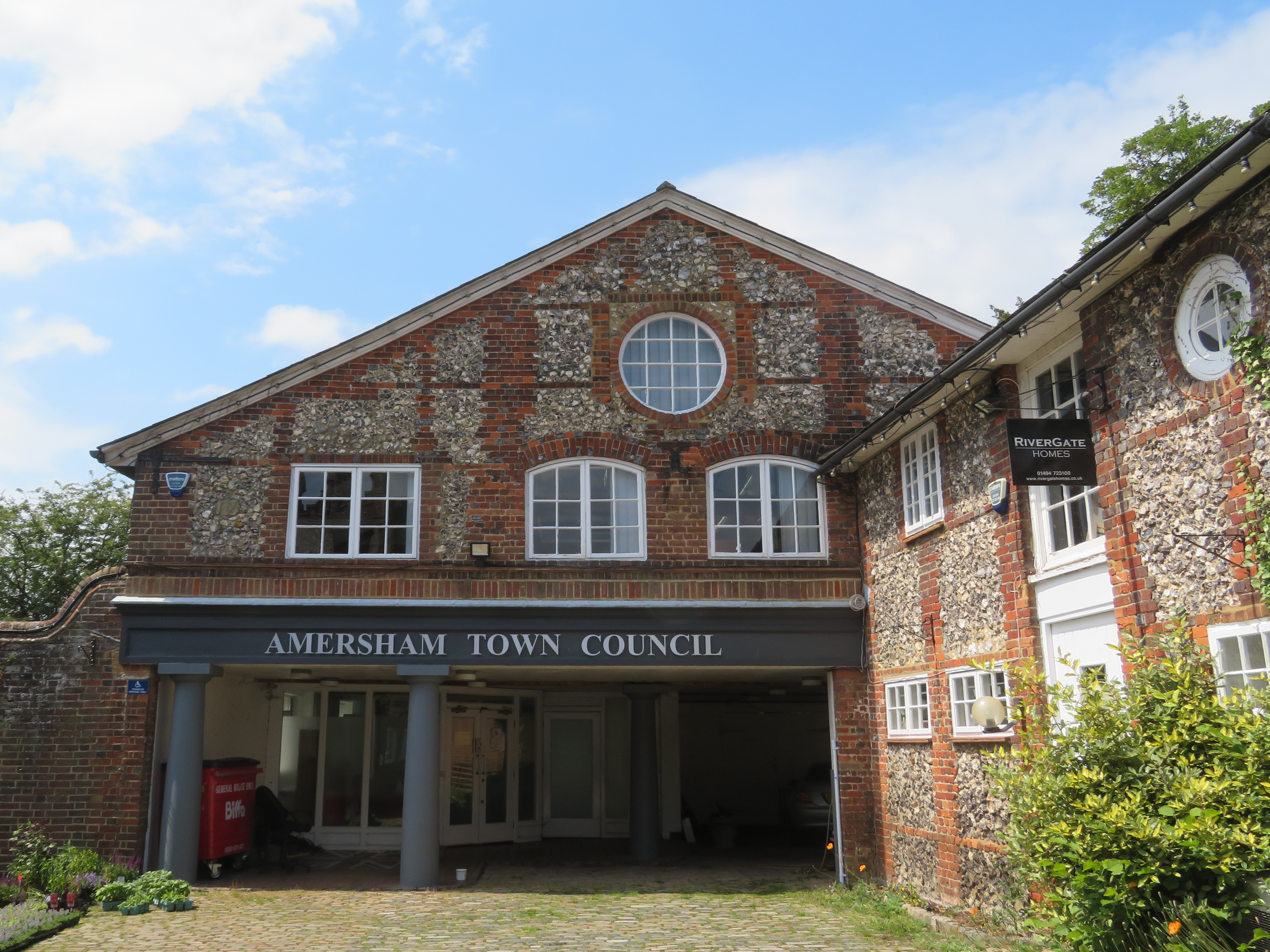
Amersham Town Council, Flint Barn Court, Church Street

There are two tiers of local government in Amersham, at parish (town) and county level: Amersham Town Council and Buckinghamshire Council. The town council is based at Flint Barn Court on Church Street in the old town.

From 1894 until local government reorganisation in 1974 the area was administered by Amersham Rural District Council, which was based at the Amersham Union Workhouse on Whielden Road until 1931 and at Elmodesham House at 42 High Street from 1931 to 1974. Amersham Parish Council was also established in 1894 and initially met at Amersham Market Hall, a prominent neoclassical style structure in the High Street. In 1974 Amersham Rural District Council merged with Chesham Urban District Council to form Chiltern District Council, whilst Amersham Parish Council became Amersham Town Council. Chiltern District Council was abolished in 2020, merging with Buckinghamshire County Council and the other Buckinghamshire district councils to form a new unitary authority called Buckinghamshire Council.

== Transport ==
=== Roads ===
The town is located at the junction of the A355 from Slough and Beaconsfield, the A404 linking Maidenhead, High Wycombe and Rickmansworth, the A416 from Chesham and Berkhamsted and the A413.

Amersham is signed from both the M25 (at junction 18) and M40 motorways (at junctions 1 and 2).

=== Railway ===
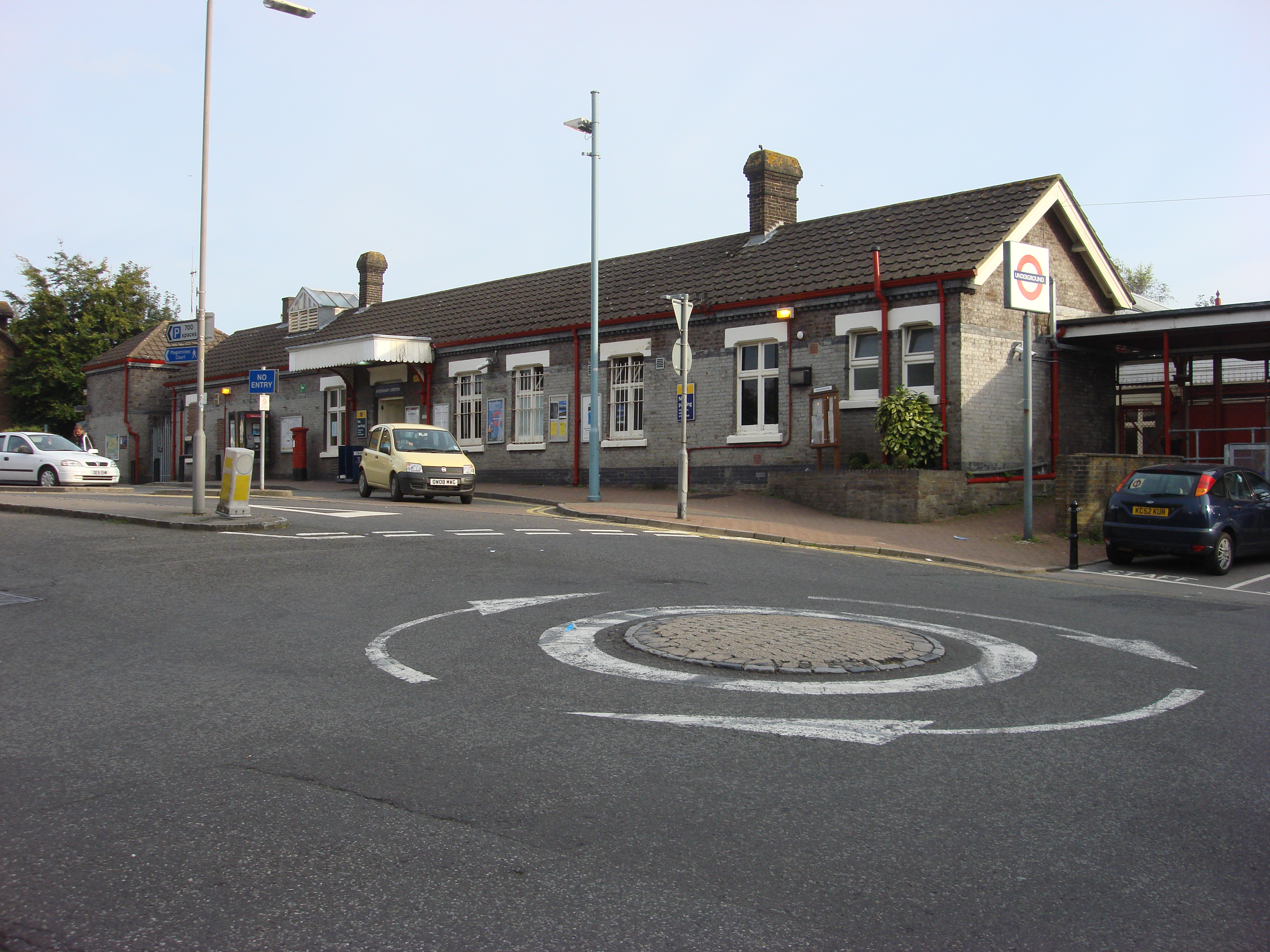
Amersham station

The area of the town now known as Amersham-on-the-Hill was referred to as Amersham Common until after the arrival of the railway in 1892. After this date the growth of the new area of the town gradually accelerated, with much work being done by the architect John Kennard. It is now known as "Amersham-on-the-Hill", "Amersham Town" or the "New Town". Amersham station is a terminus of the Metropolitan line. Much of this route is shared with the mainline railway from Marylebone to Aylesbury. Before electrification, the Metropolitan line ran via Aylesbury to Verney Junction and Brill. London Transport abandoned plans to electrify beyond Amersham and the stations and line were sold to British Railways on 11 September 1961. To this day, these Chiltern Railways stations display a characteristic Metropolitan line architecture.

The town features in the 1973 John Betjeman documentary Metro-land about the growth of suburban London in the 20th century. The construction of the railway line was controversial and objections from local landowners prevented its construction until 1892. The station was built a mile to the north of the old market town and has provided the focus of Amersham-on-the-Hill ever since. Chiltern Railways share the railway track with London Underground and run services from Marylebone to Aylesbury Vale Parkway.

=== HS2 ===
In March 2010, the Government announced the route of HS2, the proposed high-speed railway from London to Birmingham. The line will cross the Colne Valley and the M25 motorway on a viaduct, and then through a 10-mile (16 km) tunnel under the Chiltern Hills to emerge near South Heath, northwest of Amersham. The route runs roughly parallel to the A413 and the London to Aylesbury Line. A campaign of opposition is co-ordinated by a protest group, Amersham Action Group, which with other protest groups is part of the HS2 Action Alliance.

== Economy ==
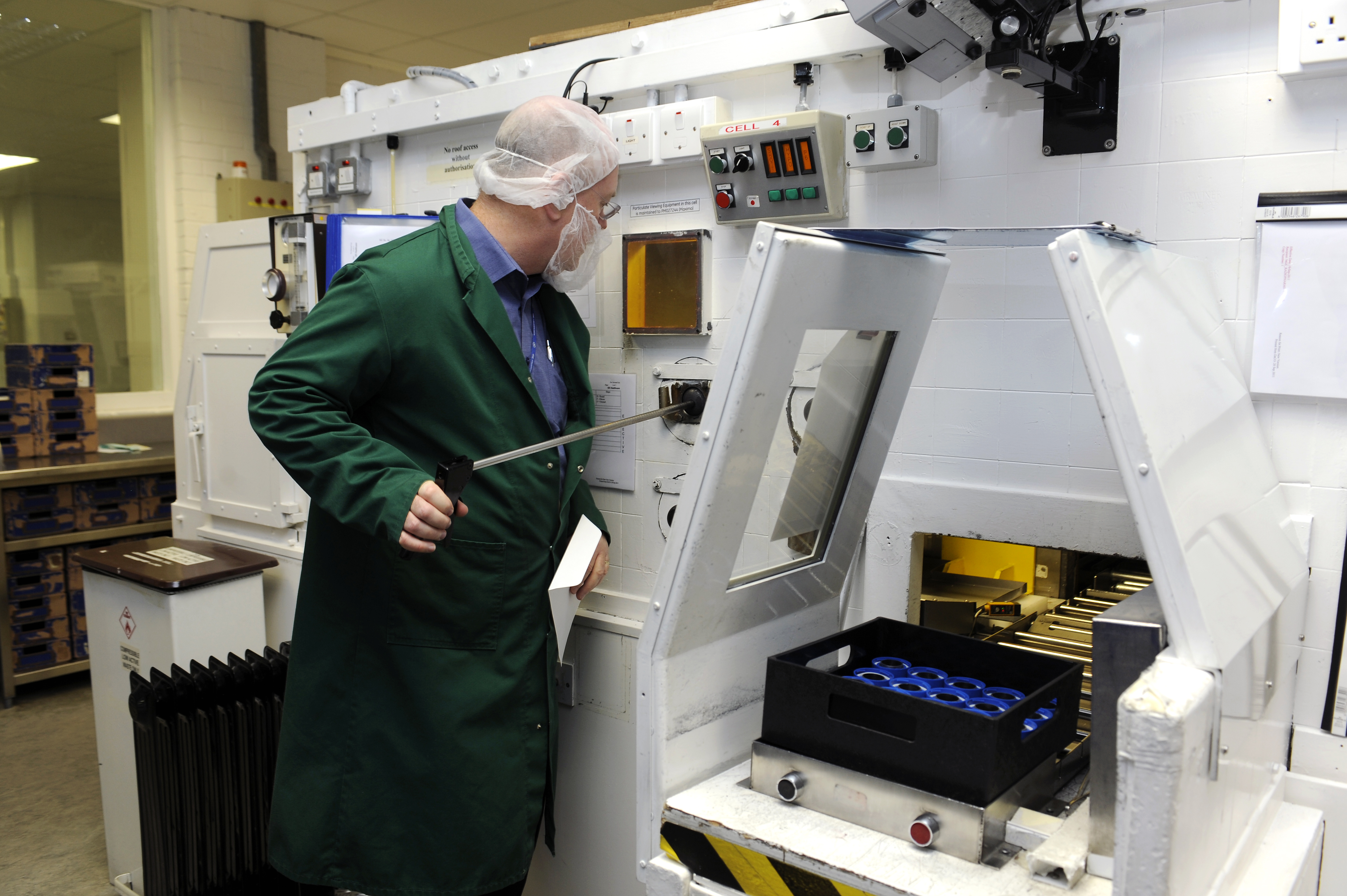
Packaging radioactive pharmaceuticals at GE Healthcare's facility

Early trade at Amersham Market was in local grain, much of which was sold to London merchants. During the 17th century and 18th century a key industry in the town was brewing. Giles Watkins (died 1636) built a brewery near St Mary's church in 1634. His brother Henry Watkins was a royal servant, a page of the robes to Anne of Denmark. William Weller of High Wycombe purchased a brewery in 1775. He, and his heirs, expanded the business by buying a number of local public houses during the next 150 years. In 1929 Gerrard Weller sold the brewery and 133 tied public houses to Benskins of Watford for £360,000, a move that led to the end of brewing in Amersham.

In addition to brewing, tanning, lace manufacture and brickmaking all had a prominent place in the manufacturing past of the town. During the Second World War, the Radiochemical Centre, a scientific research establishment, arrived in the town. This became Amersham International, then Amersham plc, and now, after a number of changes of ownership and name, is part of GE Healthcare. Halma, specialists in hazard and life protection products and headquartered in Old Amersham, is now a member of the FTSE 100 index.

== Places of worship ==
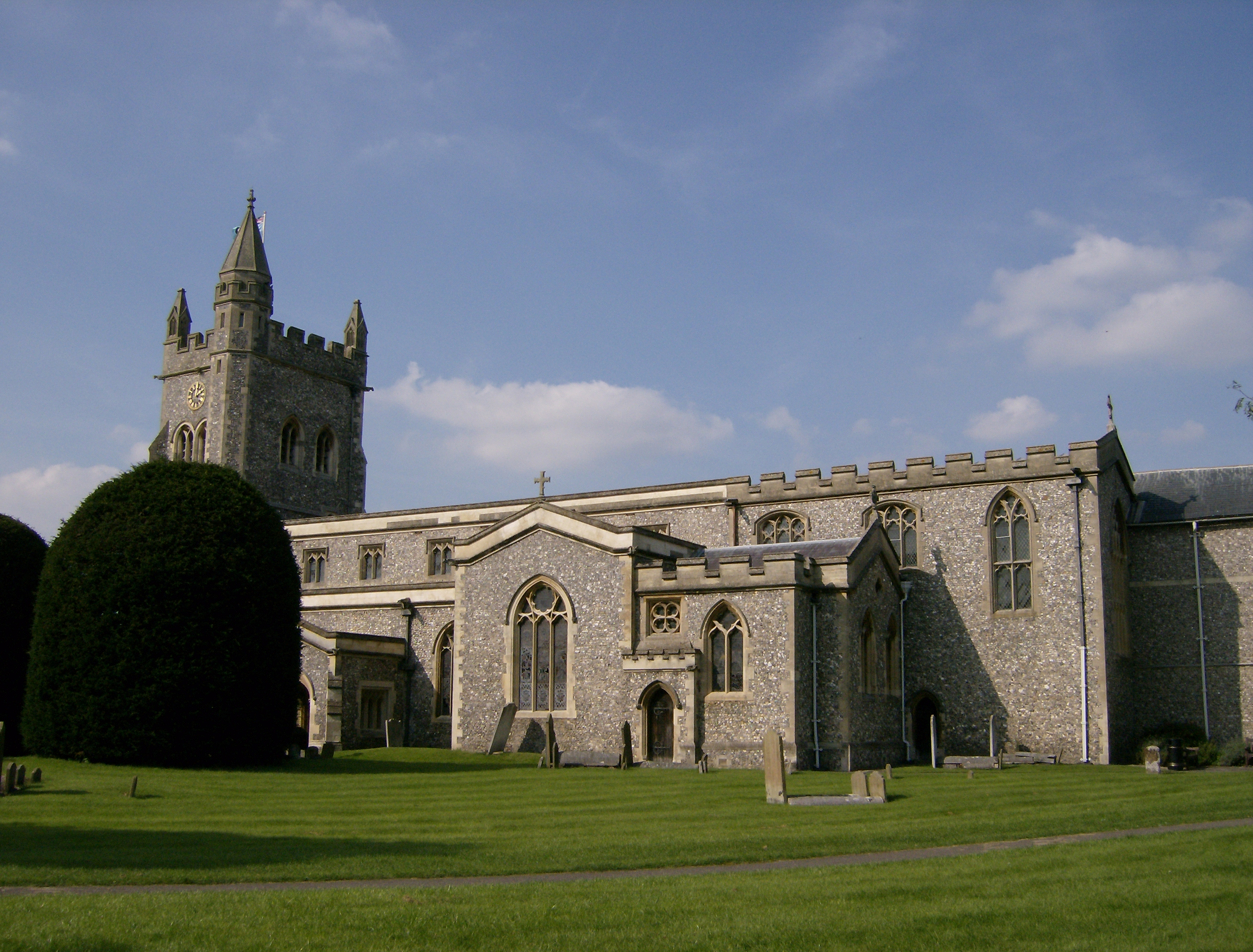
St Mary's Church, Old Amersham

Amersham-on-the-Hill has a free church which is United Reformed and Baptist and the Church of England St Michael & All Angels.

In Old Amersham stands the Grade I listed Church of England St Mary's Church, a 13th-century building that has been altered over the years. The present exterior is largely Victorian but the building contains a 14th-century font, 17th-century glass from Lamer Manor in Hertfordshire, and monuments in the chancel and in the Drake Chapel to 17th- and 18th-century notables.

Also in the town there is the Grade II* listed Amersham Meeting House (a Quaker meeting house), a Methodist church in the High Street, and King's Church Amersham, a free church.

== Education ==
There are two secondary schools located in Amersham: Dr Challoner's Grammar School for boys, and Amersham School, a non selective co-educational academy. Additionally, Amersham is included in the catchment areas of both Dr Challoner's High School, a girls' grammar school in Little Chalfont, and Chesham Grammar School, a co-educational grammar school in Chesham.

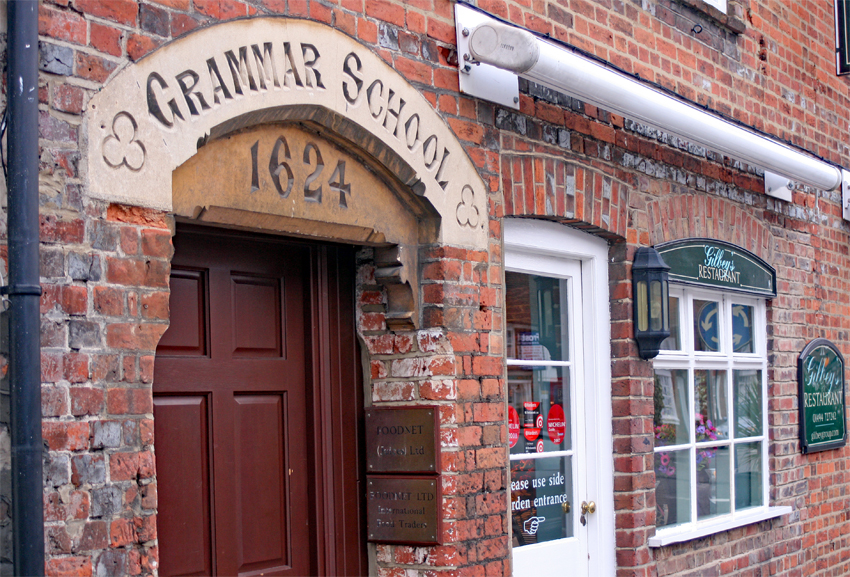
Original building for Dr Challoner's Grammar School

The Dr Challoner's schools share a common foundation dating back to 1624 when the grammar school (then for boys only) started in Old Amersham. Dr Challoner's Grammar School moved to its present site in Amersham-on-the-Hill in 1905 when it became co-educational. In 1937 the school was incorporated into the state system. After rapid growth it was decided to establish Dr Challoner's High School for Girls in nearby Little Chalfont in 1962 and Dr Challoner's Grammar School reverted to being for boys only. In 2015 Dr Challoner's Grammar School once again welcomed girls into its Sixth Form.

Amersham School opened on its current site in 1964 as the Brudenell County Secondary School (for girls). Following the closure of the Raans County Secondary School (for boys) in 1988, Brudenell became co-educational and was renamed Amersham School.

Amersham is served by several primary schools, including Our Lady's Roman Catholic Primary, Chestnut Lane School, Elangeni School, Chesham Bois Church of England School, St. Mary's Church of England Primary School, St. George's Church of England Infant School and Woodside Junior School.

There are two private preparatory schools: The Beacon School (boys) and Heatherton House (girls).

The Henry Allen Nursery School is Amersham's only state maintained nursery school.

Amersham is also served by Amersham & Wycombe College for further education.

== Sport and recreation ==
Amersham Golf Club (now defunct) was founded in 1897. The club continued until the onset of the First World War.

Amersham has a King George's Field in memorial to King George V. Near the playing field is the Chiltern Lifestyle Centre, which contains an indoor climbing wall, two swimming pools, a gym, four badminton courts, two squash courts, a library, a cafe, a children's nursery, two spas and a community centre.

Amersham Town F.C. play football at Spratley's Meadow in Old Amersham, while various football teams use council facilities at Hervines Park in Amersham-on-the-Hill and Barn Meadow in Old Amersham. Also at the Barn Meadow site is the 61 Judo Club.

Hervines Park and Barn Meadow host some cricket in the summer, but the main cricket club in the town is Amersham Cricket Club, which plays in the grounds of Shardeloes. Amersham and Chiltern Rugby Football Club play rugby union at Weedon Lane in Amersham-on-the-Hill. The Chiltern Harriers Athletics Club is the local athletics club. Amersham and Chalfont Hockey Club is the local hockey club with its own playing facility on the Amersham Campus of the Buckinghamshire College Group (formerly Amersham & Wycombe College).

== Media and communications ==
=== Local newspapers ===
The local newspaper covering Amersham and the surrounding area was the Buckinghamshire Examiner, founded in 1889, until its closure in 2019. Another Buckinghamshire newspaper with a circulation area covering Amersham is the Bucks Free Press.

=== Local radio ===
The Ofcom-licensed community radio station for the Chilterns is Chiltern Voice which broadcasts on 107.4 FM.

=== TV and mobile phone signals ===
Due to its position in a fold in the hill, TV and radio reception in Amersham can be poor and the town now has its own TV mast (at Chesham Bois). In the 1970s, Amersham was one of the last towns in the south-east to receive BBC2. Houses taking their TV reception from the Chesham Bois transmitter have vertically polarised aerials, whilst those in a good enough position receive their signal from the Crystal Palace Transmitter in London with horizontally polarised aerials – they always could receive BBC2 (and indeed Channel 4 & Channel 5). Digital terrestrial television coverage is patchy for much the same reason. Mobile phone reception can be poor in the steeper parts of Chesham and outlying villages.

== In popular culture ==
The town has been used in a number of films, including:

- The Duke Wore Jeans (1958)
- Carve Her Name with Pride (1958)
- Circus of Horrors (1960)
- Murder at the Gallop (1963)
- The Jigsaw Man (1983)
- The Shooting Party (1985)
- Four Weddings and a Funeral (1994) – Featured one of the suites in the Crown Hotel
- Metroland (1997)

== Notable people ==
- Val Biro, illustrator and author, lived in Amersham at 95 High Street
- Katy Brand, actress/comedian/writer, born and brought up in Amersham
- Anne Chamney, mechanical engineer, known for invention of a novel oxygen tent, born in Amersham.
- Simon Church, Wales international footballer, born in Amersham and attended Amersham School
- Giles Cooper, entertainment producer, born in Amersham. Best known as Chairman of the Royal Variety Performance
- Ruth Ellis, last woman hanged in England, buried in St Mary's Cemetery
- Paul Foot, comedian, born and raised in Amersham
- Cindy Gallop, advertising chief turned adult industry entrepreneur, born in Amersham
- Walter Goehr conductor, and his wife, photographer Laelia Goehr, lived at 17, Batchelors Way at the start of World War II.
- John Robins, comedian and radio presenter, currently resides in Amersham.
- Allan Gray (real name Josef Zmigrod), émigré composer best known for his film scores in the 1940s, lived in Bois Lane
- Eddie Howe, Newcastle United manager, born in Amersham
- Elizabeth Laverick, engineer, first woman to receive a PhD in a scientific subject at Durham University, born and raised in Amersham.
- Damien Lovelock, Australian musician, lead singer of The Celibate Rifles, born in Amersham
- Arthur Machen, Welsh author and mystic, resident in Amersham, buried in St Mary's Cemetery
- Bill Pertwee, actor, best known as Warden Hodges in the sitcom Dad's Army, born in Amersham
- Eileen Ramsay, photographer, brought up in Amersham
- Tim Rice, born in Amersham
- Jennifer Worth, nurse and author of The Midwife Trilogy, raised in Amersham

== Twinning ==
Amersham is twinned with:

- formerly twinned with Amersfoort in the Netherlands
- Bensheim in Germany (since 1977)
- Krynica-Zdrój in Poland
