= Infrastructure of the Brill Tramway =

Overview of the Brill Tramway's infrastructure

The Brill Tramway, also known as the Quainton Tramway, Wotton Tramway, Oxford & Aylesbury Tramroad and Metropolitan Railway Brill Branch, (Note: When built, the tramway had no official name; it was referred to in internal correspondence as "The Quainton Tramway". Following the 1872 extension and conversion to passenger use, it was officially named the "Wotton Tramway". On 1 April 1894, the Wotton Tramway was taken over by the Oxford & Aylesbury Tramroad, and retained the O&AT name officially until closure in 1935 despite never running either to Oxford or to Aylesbury. It was commonly known as the Brill Tramway from 1872 onwards (and referred to as such in some official documents such as the agreement establishing the Metropolitan and Great Central Joint Committee), and as the Metropolitan Railway Brill Branch from 1899–1935, but neither of these were official names.) was a six-mile (10 km) rail line in the Aylesbury Vale, Buckinghamshire, England. It was privately built in 1871 by the 3rd Duke of Buckingham as a horse tram line to transport goods between his lands around Wotton House and the national railway network. Lobbying from residents of the nearby town of Brill led to the line's extension to Brill and conversion to passenger use in early 1872. Two locomotives were bought for the line, but as it had been designed and built with horses in mind, services were very slow; trains travelled at an average speed of only 4 miles per hour (6.4 km/h).

In 1883, the Duke of Buckingham announced plans to upgrade the route to main line railway standards and extend the line to Oxford, creating a through route from Aylesbury to Oxford. If built, the line would have been the shortest route between Aylesbury and Oxford at the time. Despite the backing of the wealthy Ferdinand de Rothschild, investors were deterred by the costly tunnelling proposed, and the Duke was unable to raise sufficient funds. In 1888 a cheaper scheme was proposed, in which the line would be built to a lower standard and wind around hills to avoid tunnelling. In anticipation of this, the line was named the Oxford & Aylesbury Tramroad. Although the existing line was upgraded in 1894, the extension to Oxford was never built. Instead, the operation of the Brill Tramway was taken over by London's Metropolitan Railway, and Brill became one of their two north-western termini. The line was rebuilt a second time in 1910, and more advanced locomotives were introduced, allowing trains to run faster.

In 1933, the Metropolitan Railway was taken into public ownership and became the Metropolitan line of London Transport. As a result, the Brill Tramway became a part of the London Underground. The management of London Transport aimed to concentrate on electrification and the improvement of passenger services in London, and saw little possibility that the former Metropolitan Railway routes in Buckinghamshire could ever become viable passenger routes. In 1935 all services on the Brill Tramway were withdrawn, and the line was closed. The infrastructure of the route was dismantled and sold shortly afterwards. Very little trace of the Brill Tramway remains, other than the former junction station at Quainton Road, now the Buckinghamshire Railway Centre.

== Stations ==
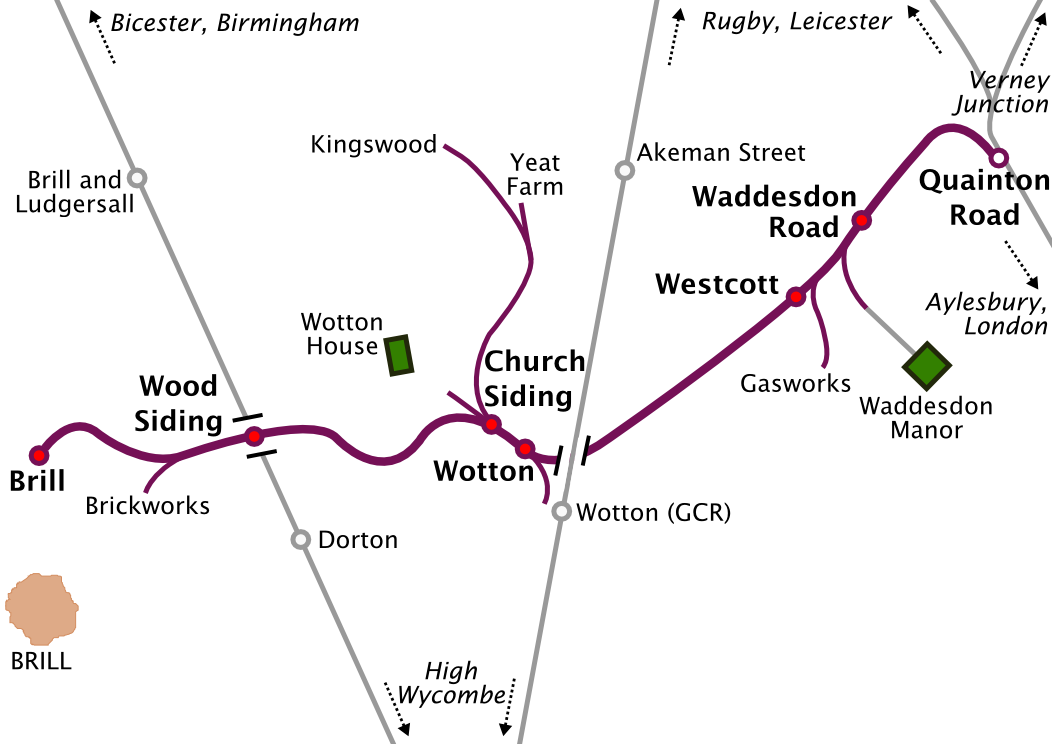
The full extent of the Brill Tramway system. Not all lines and stations shown on this diagram were open contemporaneously.

When the line was opened in 1871–72, the stations were 6-inch (150 mm) high crude earth banks, held in place by wooden planks. In 1894, in preparation for the Oxford extension, Waddesdon, Westcott, Wotton and Brill stations were provided with buildings containing a booking office, waiting rooms and toilets, while Wood Siding station was equipped with a small waiting room "with shelf and drawer". Church Siding station was not included in the rebuilding, and ceased to be listed in the timetable at this time.

=== Quainton Road ===
The relationship between the Brill Tramway (left), Verney Junction branch (right) and MR main line (bottom) 1903. This map is rotated approximately 45% from north.

Quainton Road originally consisted of two separate stations, one on the Aylesbury and Buckingham Railway and one on the Wotton Tramway. The only physical link between the two lines was a turntable. Before 1895, the station was referred to as both "Quainton Road" and "Quainton" indiscriminately. Between 1895 and 1897 the Metropolitan Railway repositioned the station building from the west to the east side of the former A&BR line, freeing space for a junction between the two lines to be built. The section of the station serving the Aylesbury line remained open to passengers until 4 March 1963, and to goods traffic until 4 July 1966. In 1969 the Quainton Road Society was formed to preserve the station. The station, along with former wartime emergency food depots and sections of siding preserved as a demonstration line, is now the Buckinghamshire Railway Centre. Between 1999 and 2000, the original Buckinghamshire Railway's Oxford terminus of Oxford Rewley Road railway station was dismantled and reassembled alongside the existing station buildings at Quainton Road.

Quainton Road is still connected to the railway network and used by occasional special passenger services,

=== Waddesdon ===
Waddesdon was known as "Waddesdon Road Siding" at the time of the line's opening, but was renamed "Waddesdon" when the line was converted for passenger use. It was heavily used during the construction of Baron Ferdinand de Rothschild's estate at Waddesdon Manor in the 1870s and 1880s. The station was little used other than for shipping milk from nearby farms to Aylesbury and London. Inconveniently sited away from any nearby towns and villages, and with the far more frequently served Quainton Road and Waddesdon Manor stations within easy walking distance, the station saw very little passenger use. In 1932, the last year of private operation, Waddesdon Road station saw only 281 passengers making only £4 (about £200 in 2025) in passenger receipts over the entire year. It was renamed "Waddesdon Road" in 1922, when Waddesdon Manor station on the former Aylesbury and Buckingham Railway between Aylesbury and Quainton Road was renamed "Waddesdon".

=== Westcott ===
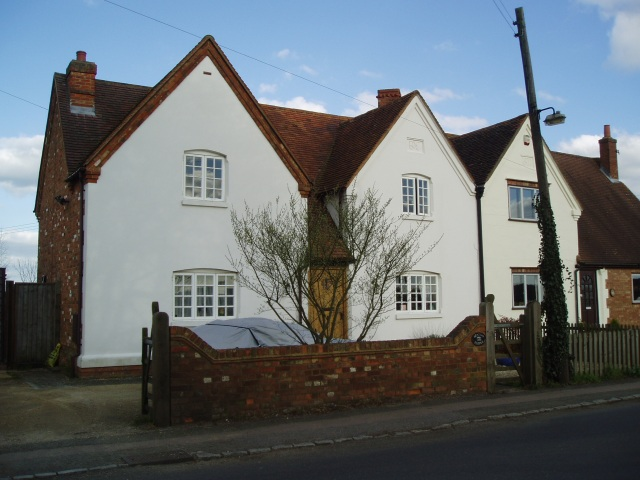
The former Tramway-owned staff cottages at Westcott, now a single house. The original station building survives as a shed in the garden.

Westcott was sometimes known in early years as "Wescott". Two cottages for tramway staff were built next to the station in 1871. It was removed from the timetable by 1931, although trains continued to stop on request. Westcott was a small village with a population of about 150, and passenger usage was low; in 1932 Westcott station saw only 1,560 passengers and made only £27 (about £1,600 in 2025) in passenger receipts. The station building remains in place in the back garden of the former station house, now a private residence, and carries an exact replica of its original "Westcott" station sign. Aside from Quainton Road station, the two buildings at Westcott are the only significant structures associated with the Tramway to have survived.

=== Wotton ===
Wotton was a focal point of the line, and the site of the Tramway's forge and the stables for its horses. With a population at the time of the line's opening of 220, Wotton served a smaller populated area than Brill, but as the loading place for goods from Church Siding and the Kingswood branch it handled the majority of goods traffic. As much as 90 per cent of milk traffic carried by the Tramway was loaded at Wotton. The station was situated on a sharp curve and, had the extension to Oxford been built, it would have needed resiting to accommodate longer and faster trains. Wotton had the highest passenger numbers on the line other than Brill itself and the junction station at Quainton Road; in 1932 the station saw 2,648 passenger journeys earning a total of £144 (about £8,700 in 2025) in passenger receipts. Wotton station on the Great Western and Great Central Joint Railway, which in 1923 had been taken over by the London and North Eastern Railway, remained open (albeit little used and served by only two trains per day in each direction) until 7 December 1953 All buildings of the Tramway station at Wotton were subsequently demolished, other than a small building which had once housed the Tramway's forge, which was left derelict.

=== Church Siding ===
Church Siding was immediately west of Wotton. It was treated as a station during the Tramway's early years and listed as such in timetables, but was never redeveloped following the conversion to locomotive haulage and its "platform" remained an earth bank with no buildings. Trains heading down the Quainton Road–Brill line would pause at the entrance to the siding, and any wagons intended for the siding would be detached and hauled down the siding by rope. It ceased to be listed in timetables in September 1894, although there is some evidence that passenger trains ceased to make scheduled stops at Church Siding before this date. Freight trains are recorded as stopping at Church Siding to load goods as late as 1899. Church Siding was the scene of the Tramway's only fatal accident, on 8 March 1883.

=== Wood Siding ===
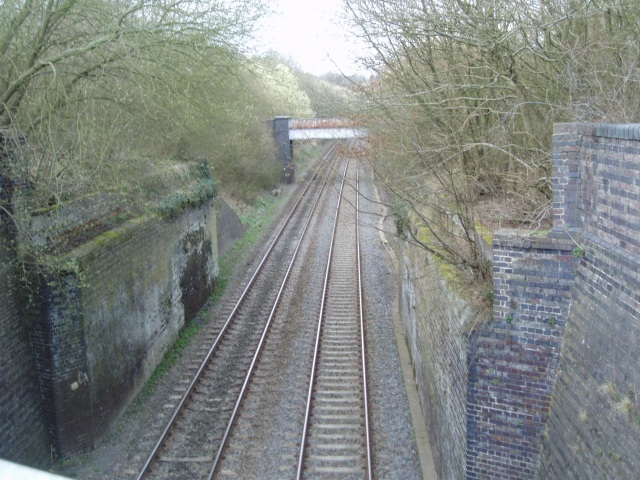
The Chiltern Main Line passes the ruins of the bridge which once supported Wood Siding, 2005.

Wood Siding initially had no facilities for passengers, not even a platform. In 1894 a low platform and small corrugated iron waiting room were built for passengers. As well as the passenger platform, a short siding led to a raised wooden platform, alongside the through line to Brill, which served both as a buffer stop for the siding, and as a loading platform for milk. The station was staffed by a single porter, responsible for opening the gates of a nearby level crossing and for loading and unloading freight (mainly milk); a small, unheated hut was provided for his use. While the original Aveling & Porter locomotive was slow and noisy and could be heard by the porter long before its arrival, later locomotives were quieter and quicker; a ladder was installed against a large oak for the porter to watch for oncoming trains. Wood Siding station and its siding were rebuilt at the GWR's expense between 1908–1910 to stand on a wide bridge above the new Chiltern Main Line. Wood Siding was removed from the timetable by 1931, although trains continued to stop on request. While Wood Siding station was demolished shortly after closure, the abutments of the bridge which carried the station and sidings remain intact. The porter's hut survives as a nearby garden shed.

=== Brill ===
Brill was valuable as a shipment point between the dairy farms of Buckinghamshire and the markets of Aylesbury and London. Around 30 carts per day would deliver milk to Brill station for the first train each morning. There was also a small amount of coal traffic to the station; Brill coal dealer George Green received three coal wagons per month. In addition, a storehouse at the station held beer supplied by the breweries of Brackley and Aylesbury. Two cottages for station staff were built near the station in 1871. A third cottage was built in 1885, possibly to serve as an office. Brill station was relatively little used by passengers; in 1932, Brill and Wood Siding saw only 3,272 passenger journeys and raised only £191 (about £11,500 in 2025) in passenger receipts. Since the closure, all buildings in Brill associated with the railway station have been demolished, with the exception of the station cottages, and the station site is now mostly open fields.

== Locomotives ==
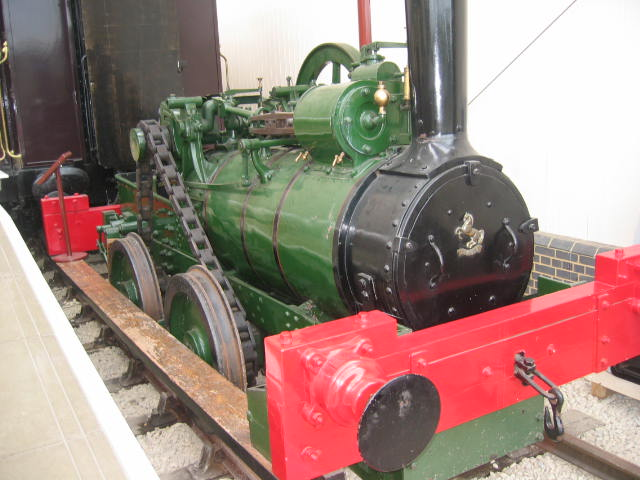
Aveling and Porter number 807 (Wotton Tramway No. 1), nicknamed "Old Chainey", the first locomotive used on the Wotton Tramway

The first two locomotives operated on the line were 0-4-0 single-cylinder geared steam locomotives of the traction engine type built by Aveling and Porter, works numbers 807 and 846. A crankshaft drove a 3-foot-6-inch (1.07 m) flywheel which in turn drove chains attached to the wheels. They were delivered in 1872, and numbered 1 & 2. Following the 1894 authorisation of the rebuilt line to operate as a railway, both locomotives failed to meet minimum speed requirements for railway operations. Both were sold on 23 September 1895 to the Heyford Iron Company in Northamptonshire. No. 2 was found to have a faulty boiler, and was used as a source of spares for No. 1. By 1922, the Heyford Iron Company had developed a brickworks, and No 1 was used for haulage there until the closure of the brickworks in 1940. In the 1950s No. 1 was restored by London Transport at Neasden Depot, and was transferred to the Clapham Museum of British Transport on 19 January 1957. It was displayed there until March 1973, when it was transferred to the London Transport Museum. Since then it has been displayed at the London Transport Museum and at the Buckinghamshire Railway Centre at Quainton Road.

The next two locomotives were manufactured by W. G. Bagnall: Buckingham, 0-4-0ST, works number 16, built 1876, and Wotton, 0-4-0T, works number 120, built 1877. They were unusual in having "reversed" inside cylinders, which drove the front axle. Bagnall used a single numbering scheme for all their products; although the locomotives had the works numbers 16 and 120, they were in fact the first and third locomotives made by the company. Buckingham was hired, not owned; it was returned to Bagnall's in February 1878. Wotton was sold in around 1894.

By 1894, two Manning Wardle locomotives were in use: Huddersfield, works number 616, built 1876, and Earl Temple, works number 1249, built 1894. Huddersfield was bought second-hand and had originally been named Prestwich. Earl Temple, later renamed Brill No.1, was identical to Huddersfield other than having a covered cab, and was bought new. The Oxford & Aylesbury Tramroad could not afford the price, and thus Earl Temple was owned directly by the Earl and rented to the O&AT. Wotton No. 2, works number 1415, built 1899, was bought on 7 February 1899 to replace Huddersfield. All three were 0-6-0ST with inside cylinders. The decrepit Huddersfield was sold in 1901, and the other two Manning Wardle locomotives were sold in 1909.

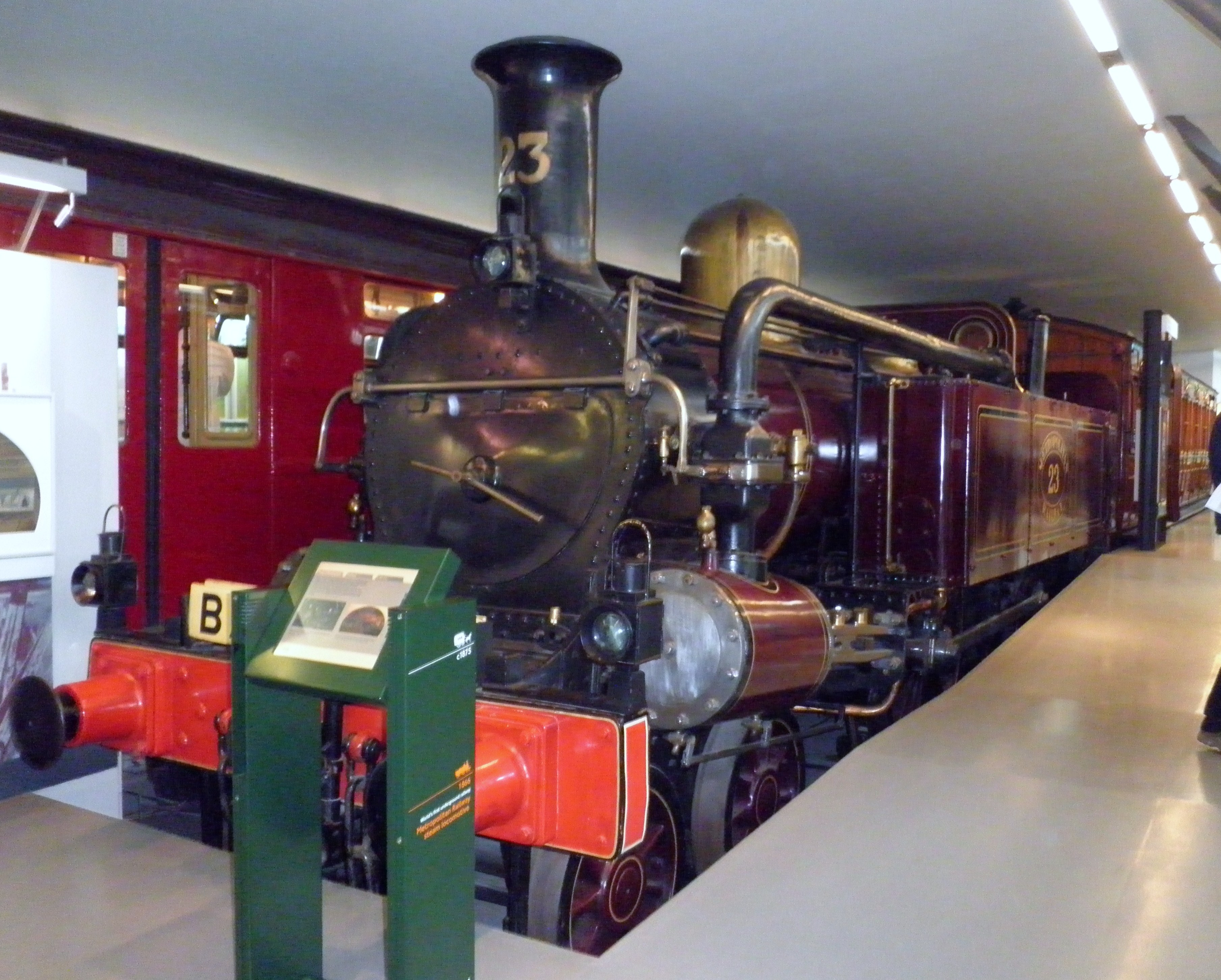
MR No. 23, one of the two A Class locomotives in use on the Brill branch until its closure.

From 1903, the Manning Wardle locomotives were replaced by Metropolitan Railway D Class 2-4-0 tank engines, numbered 71 and 72. The D Class locomotives were unsatisfactory to the MR, and between 1916 and 1922 the MR sold their entire stock of D Class engines. Their place on the O&AT was taken by two Metropolitan Railway A Class 4-4-0T locomotives numbered 23 and 41, built by Beyer, Peacock and Company in 1866 and 1869 respectively. The A Class locomotives would alternate in service, each operating the route for a week. No. 41 was scrapped in 1936, but No. 23 continued to be used by London Transport until 1948, and is now preserved in the London Transport Museum.

== Carriages and wagons ==
Details of the carriages and wagons used in the very early years of the Tramway are uncertain. By 1879 the company operated a fleet of nine four-wheeled goods wagons, some with 9-inch (230 mm) and some with 11-inch (280 mm) high sides. All nine wagons were fitted with dumb buffers, and as a consequence did not comply with Railway Clearing House standards and could not be used on other lines. When it was necessary to run through traffic from the Aylesbury and Buckingham Railway onto the Tramway via the Quainton Road turntable, appropriate wagons and trucks were hired from the GWR or London and North Western Railway. It is also known that a passenger tram carriage was owned by the Tramway by March 1873. This passenger carriage seated 16–20 passengers and although it had been designed as a horse tram, was fitted with buffers allowing it to be used in trains. By 1878 (when it is recorded as being repaired) the company also owned a passenger carriage divided into a third-class compartment, a second-class compartment and a luggage compartment.

In 1895, two new passenger carriages, each accommodating 40 passengers, were bought by the Oxford & Aylesbury Tramroad Company from the Bristol Wagon & Carriage Works as part of the programme of improvements in anticipation of the extension to Oxford. On 4 October 1899 the MR loaned the O&AT an eight-wheeled 70 seat passenger carriage. Following the takeover of the O&AT by the MR, goods services were operated by a fleet of five eight-wheeled carriages built in 1865–66. Two cattle wagons were added to the line's stock in the 1920s.

== See also ==
- Infrastructure of the East Coast Main Line
- Infrastructure of the Settle–Carlisle line

== Notes and references ==
=== Bibliography ===
- Demuth, Tim (2003). The Spread of London's Underground. Harrow Weald: Capital Transport. ISBN 1-85414-266-6.
- Horne, Mike (2003). The Metropolitan Line: An illustrated history. Harrow Weald: Capital Transport. ISBN 1-85414-275-5.
- Jackson, Alan (2006). London's Metro-Land. Harrow: Capital History. ISBN 1-85414-300-X. OCLC 144595813.
- Jones, Ken (1974). The Wotton Tramway (Brill Branch). Locomotion Papers. Blandford: The Oakwood Press. ISBN 0-85361-149-1.
- Jones, Robin (2010). Britain's Weirdest Railways. Horncastle, Lincolnshire: Mortons Media Group. ISBN 978-1-906167-25-7.
- Lee, Charles E. (1935). "The Duke of Buckingham's Railways: with special reference to the Brill line". Railway Magazine. 77 (460): 235–241.
- Melton, Ian (1984). R. J., Greenaway (ed.). "From Quainton to Brill: A history of the Wotton Tramway". Underground (13). Hemel Hempstead: The London Underground Railway Society. ISSN 0306-8609.
- Mitchell, Vic; Smith, Keith (2006). Aylesbury to Rugby. Midhurst: Middleton Press. ISBN 1-904474-91-8.
- Oppitz, Leslie (2000). Lost Railways of the Chilterns. Newbury: Countryside Books. ISBN 1-85306-643-5. OCLC 45682620.
- Simpson, Bill (1985). The Brill Tramway. Poole: Oxford Publishing. ISBN 0-86093-218-4.
- Simpson, Bill (2005). A History of the Metropolitan Railway. Vol. 3. Witney: Lamplight Publications. ISBN 1-899246-13-4.
