= Westcott railway station =

Railway station in Westcott, Buckinghamshire

Westcott
- Westcott station in October 1935, shortly before closure
- Interactive map of Westcott

General information
- Location: Westcott, Buckinghamshire
- Local authority: Buckinghamshire
- Owner: Wotton Tramway
- Number of platforms: 1

Key dates
- 1871: Opened (freight only)
- 1872: Opened for passengers
- 1894: Rebuilt
- 1899: Leased by Metropolitan Railway
- 1935: Closed by London Transport

Other information
- Coordinates: 51.84500°N 0.95556°W

Westcott railway station was a small station built to serve the village of Westcott, Buckinghamshire, and nearby buildings attached to Baron Ferdinand de Rothschild's estate at Waddesdon Manor. It was built by the Duke of Buckingham in 1871 as part of a short horse-drawn tramway to allow for the transport of goods from and around his extensive estates in Buckinghamshire and to connect the Duke's estates to the Aylesbury and Buckingham Railway at Quainton Road. A lobbying campaign by residents of the town of Brill led to the tramway being converted for passenger use and extended to Brill railway station in 1872, becoming known as the Brill Tramway.

Cheaply built and ungraded, and using poor quality locomotives, services on the line were very slow, initially limited to 5 miles per hour (8 km/h). In the 1890s it was planned to extend the tramway to Oxford, but the scheme was abandoned. Instead, the operation of the line was taken over by the Metropolitan Railway in 1899.

Following the 1933 transfer of the Metropolitan Railway to public ownership to become the Metropolitan line of London Transport, Westcott station became a part of the London Underground, despite being over 40 miles (64 km) from central London. The management of London Transport believed it very unlikely that the line could ever be made viable, and Westcott station was closed, along with the rest of the line, from 30 November 1935. The station building and its associated house are the only significant buildings from the Brill Tramway to survive other than the former junction station at Quainton Road.

== Brill Tramway ==
On 23 September 1868 the small Aylesbury and Buckingham Railway (A&BR) opened, linking the Great Western Railway's station at Aylesbury to the London and North Western Railway's Oxford to Bletchley line at Verney Junction. On 1 September 1894 London's Metropolitan Railway (MR) reached Aylesbury, and shortly afterwards connected to the A&BR line, with local MR services running to Verney Junction from 1 April 1894. Through trains from the MR's London terminus at Baker Street commenced on 1 January 1897.

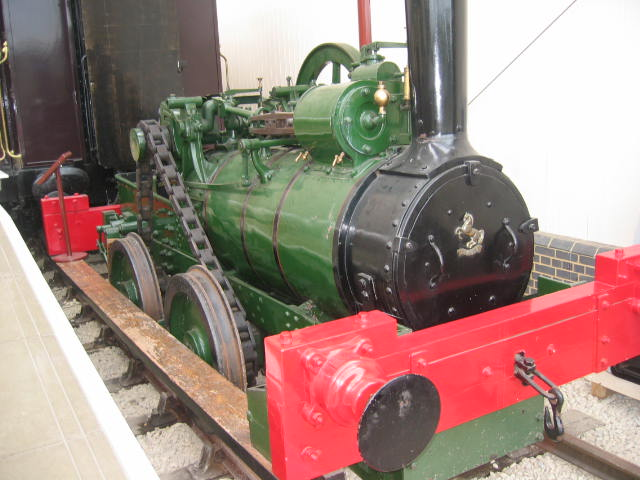
One of the original 1871 Aveling and Porter locomotives used by the line

Richard Plantagenet Campbell Temple-Nugent-Brydges-Chandos-Grenville, 3rd Duke of Buckingham and Chandos, had long had an interest in railways, and had served as Chairman of the London and North Western Railway from 1852 to 1861. In the early 1870s he decided to build a light railway to carry freight from his estates in Buckinghamshire to the A&BR's line at Quainton Road. (Note: Because the proposed line ran on land owned by the Duke of Buckingham and by the Winwood Charity Trust, who consented to its construction, the line did not need Parliamentary approval and construction could begin immediately.) The first stage of the line, known as the Wotton Tramway, was a 4-mile (6.4 km) line from Quainton Road via Wotton to a coal siding at Kingswood, and opened on 1 April 1871. Intended for use by horse trams, the line was built with longitudinal sleepers to avoid horses tripping on the sleepers.

Lobbying from the nearby town of Brill for the introduction of passenger services on the line led to an extension from Wotton to Brill railway station, at the foot of Brill Hill 3/4 of a mile (1.2 of a km) from the hilltop town of Brill itself, in the summer of 1872 and the introduction of two mixed trains each day in each direction, at which time the line was renamed the Brill Tramway. The Duke bought two Aveling and Porter traction engines modified to work as locomotives for the line, each with a top speed of 8 miles per hour (13 km/h), although a speed limit of 5 miles per hour (8 km/h) was enforced.

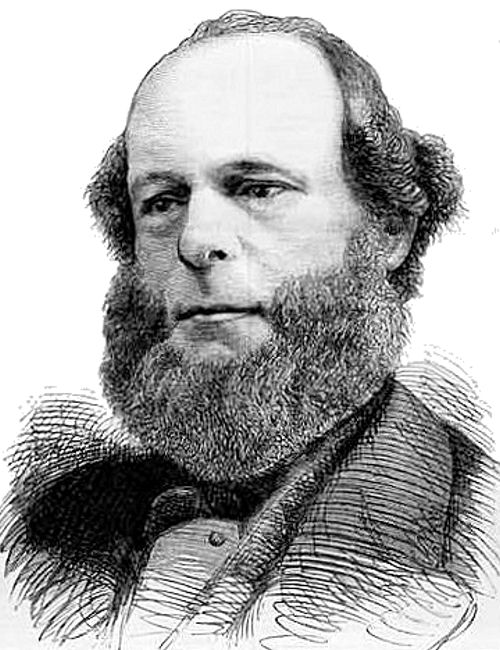
The Duke of Buckingham, founder of the Brill Tramway

The Duke died in 1889, and in 1894 the trustees of his estate set up the Oxford & Aylesbury Tramroad Company (O&ATC) with the intention of extending the line from Brill to Oxford. (Note: Rail services from London to Oxford were very poor at this time; despite being an extremely roundabout route, had the connection from Quainton Road to Oxford been built it would have been the shortest route between Oxford and the City of London.) The MR leased the Brill Tramway from 1 December 1899, although the line continued to be owned by the O&ATC. (Note: Although from 1899 services were operated by the Metropolitan Railway (the Metropolitan line of the London Underground from July 1933), the track and stations remained owned by the Oxford & Aylesbury Tramroad Company and controlled by the Trustees of the late Earl Temple's Estate. The MR had an option to purchase the line outright, but it was never taken up.)

== Services and facilities ==
Westcott station was the second station from Quainton Road, about 1 1/2 miles (2.4 km) east of Quainton Road. The station consisted of a single platform with a small wooden station building, and was immediately south of the village of Westcott, which at the time of the railway's opening had a population of about 150. Initially named "Westcott Siding", the station was renamed "Westcott" shortly after opening. The station was initially built with a single low wooden platform, primarily intended for loading and unloading freight. After the 1899 transfer of services to the Metropolitan Railway, the MR introduced a single Brown Marshall passenger carriage on the line; at this time, a short section of platform was raised to conventional height to allow access to the higher doors on the new carriage.

Limited by poor quality locomotives and the bumpy, cheaply laid track which followed the contours of the hills, trains ran very slowly in the area; in 1882 trains took 20 minutes to travel the short distance from Quainton Road to Westcott, and 50 minutes from Westcott to Brill.

From 1872 to 1894 Westcott station was served by two passenger trains per day in each direction, and from 1895 to 1899 the number was increased to three per day. Following the 1899 transfer of services to the Metropolitan Railway, the station was served by four trains per day in each direction until closure in 1935. Improvements to the line carried out at the time of the transfer to the Oxford & Aylesbury Tramroad reduced journey times from Westcott to Quainton Road and Brill to 13 minutes and 28 minutes respectively.

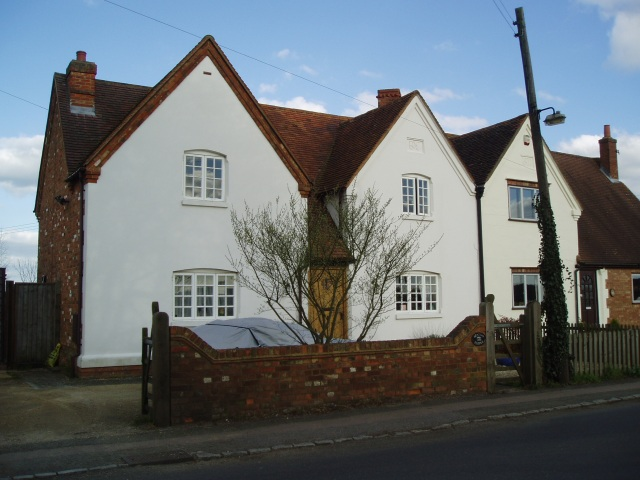
The former station house at Westcott

Passenger trains generally served the station only on weekdays, although between 1903 and 1922 trains also ran on Sundays. While the village of Westcott was small, the proximity of Baron Ferdinand de Rothschild's estate at Waddesdon Manor made Westcott one of the busier stations on the branch in terms of passenger and goods traffic.

Despite the low frequency of service and relatively low numbers of people using the station, Westcott station was staffed; the single employee's responsibilities included maintaining the oil lamps on the platform and working a nearby level crossing gate. As with all employees on the line, staff at the station were contractually obliged to "devote themselves exclusively to the service, attend regularly during the appointed hours and to refrain from using improper language, cursing or swearing". The single member of staff was provided with a house immediately adjacent to the station; built by the Duke of Buckingham, the house bears the inscription "B&C" (Buckingham & Chandos).

A small gasworks a short distance to the south of Westcott station opened in 1889 to provide power to Waddesdon Manor and to other buildings on the Rothschild's estate. A short spur line was built from Westcott station to the gasworks, running immediately parallel to the road south from Westcott village. In 1926 the gasworks closed and was replaced by an electrical generator elsewhere on the Waddesdon Manor grounds, and the track of the spur was removed.

== Closure ==
On Saturday night, for the last time, an antiquated little tank engine drew an equally antiquated passenger coach along the seven-mile railway line between the Bucks villages of Quainton Road and Brill. The train contained officials of the Metropolitan Railway Company, including an assistant superintendent. It stopped at each of the five stations on the line. Documents, records, and all valuables from each station were placed in the guard's van and then the station lights were put out and the train steamed along to its destination at Quainton Road. Soon the engine and coach will be on their way to Neasden and the scrap heap.

— The Times, 2 December 1935

On 1 July 1933 the Metropolitan Railway, along with London's other underground railways aside from the small Waterloo & City Railway, was taken into public ownership as part of the newly formed London Passenger Transport Board (LPTB). As a consequence, despite it being 43 miles (69 km) from the City of London, Westcott station became part of the London Underground network. (Note: Despite being a part of the London Underground network, Westcott—in common with all Metropolitan line stations north of Aylesbury—was never shown on the tube map.) The Brill Tramway was by this time losing significant sums of money. Goods traffic had dwindled, and unlike other areas served by the former Metropolitan Railway, passenger numbers were low; in 1932 Westcott station saw only 1,560 passengers and collected only £27 (about £1,600 in 2025) in passenger receipts.

Frank Pick, managing director of the Underground Group from 1928 and the Chief Executive of the LPTB, saw the lines beyond Aylesbury to Brill and Verney Junction as having little future as financially viable passenger routes, concluding that over £2000 (about £120,000 in 2025) would be saved simply by closing the Brill Tramway. As a consequence, the LPTB decided to abandon all passenger services beyond Aylesbury. (Note: While the Brill Tramway was closed completely following transfer to public ownership, the LPTB considered the Verney Junction branch as having a use as a freight line and as a diversionary route, and continued to maintain the line and to operate freight services until 6 September 1947.) The Brill Tramway was closed on 1 December 1935, with the last trains running on 30 November.

== After closure ==
Upon the withdrawal of London Transport services the lease expired and the railway and stations reverted to the control of the Oxford & Aylesbury Tramroad Company. With no funds and no rolling stock of its own the O&ATC was unable to operate the line, and on 2 April 1936 the entire infrastructure of the line was sold at auction. The cheapest of the 53 lots sold were the Westcott station sign and the oil lamps from the Westcott level crossing, both of which sold for one shilling. (Note: The most expensive lot sold was the 37-yard (34 m) platform of Waddesdon Road railway station, which fetched £7 10s (about £1,070 in 2025). Excluding the station houses at Westcott and Brill, which were sold separately, the auction raised £112 10s (about £6,870 in 2025) in total.) The railway house at Westcott was also sold, fetching £305 (about £18,600 in 2025).

Metropolitan line trains ceased to run north of Aylesbury from 6 July 1936. London and North Eastern Railway services (British Rail from 1948) continued to run from London's Marylebone station over the line to Verney Junction via Quainton Road until March 1963. (Note: Verney Junction remained open to serve trains on the Oxford–Bletchley line. It was closed following the withdrawal of services between Oxford and Cambridge from 1 January 1968.) No trace of the line at Westcott remains, but the station building remains in place in the back garden of the former station house, now a private residence, and carries an exact replica of its original "Westcott" station sign. Aside from the junction station at Quainton Road, now preserved as the Buckinghamshire Railway Centre, the two buildings at Westcott are the only significant buildings associated with the Brill Tramway to have survived.

== See also ==
- Infrastructure of the Brill Tramway

== Notes and references ==
=== Bibliography ===
- Connor, J. E. (2000). Abandoned Stations on London's Underground. Colchester: Connor & Butler. ISBN 0-947699-30-9. OCLC 59577006.
- Demuth, Tim (2003). The Spread of London's Underground. Harrow Weald: Capital Transport. ISBN 1-85414-266-6.
- Foxell, Clive (2010). The Metropolitan Line: London's first underground railway. Stroud: The History Press. ISBN 978-0-7524-5396-5. OCLC 501397186.
- Horne, Mike (2003). The Metropolitan Line: An illustrated history. Harrow Weald: Capital Transport. ISBN 1-85414-275-5.
- Jackson, Alan (2006). London's Metro-Land. Harrow: Capital History. ISBN 1-85414-300-X. OCLC 144595813.
- Mitchell, Vic; Smith, Keith (2006). Aylesbury to Rugby. Midhurst: Middleton Press. ISBN 1-904474-91-8.
- Oppitz, Leslie (2000). Lost Railways of the Chilterns. Newbury: Countryside Books. ISBN 1-85306-643-5. OCLC 45682620.
- Simpson, Bill (2005). A History of the Metropolitan Railway. Vol. 3. Witney: Lamplight Publications. ISBN 1-899246-13-4.

Preceding station	Disused railways	Following station
Wotton; Line and station closed	Metropolitan Railway; Brill Tramway	Waddesdon Road; Line and station closed
