= Waddesdon Road railway station =

Former Brill Tramway (Later Metropolitan Railway) Station in Buckinghamshire

Waddesdon Road
- Interactive map of Waddesdon Road

General information
- Location: Waddesdon, Buckinghamshire
- Local authority: Buckinghamshire
- Owner: Wotton Tramway
- Number of platforms: 1

Key dates
- 1871: Opened for freight, as Waddesdon Road Siding
- 1872: Opened for passengers, renamed Waddesdon
- 1894: Rebuilt
- 1899: Public ownership (Metropolitan Railway)
- 1922: Renamed Waddesdon Road
- 1935: Closed by London Transport

Other information
- Coordinates: 51.8519°N 0.9468°W

Waddesdon Road railway station, called Waddesdon railway station before 1922, was a small halt in open countryside in Buckinghamshire, England. It was opened in 1871 as part of a short horse-drawn tramway to assist with the transport of goods from and around the Duke of Buckingham's extensive estates in Buckinghamshire and to connect the Duke's estates to the Aylesbury and Buckingham Railway at Quainton Road. In 1872 the line was expanded and converted for passenger use, becoming known as the Brill Tramway. In 1899 the operation of the line was taken over by the London-based Metropolitan Railway.

In 1933 the Metropolitan Railway was taken into public ownership to become the Metropolitan line of the London Underground, and despite its rural setting Waddesdon Road station became a part of the London Transport system. The new management could not see a future for the line as a financially viable passenger route, and Waddesdon Road, along with the rest of the former Brill Tramway, was closed in late 1935.

The station was heavily used for the transport of construction materials during the building of Baron Ferdinand de Rothschild's estate at Waddesdon Manor in the 1870s and 1880s, but aside from that it saw little use. The station was inconveniently sited and served by few passenger trains, and other more frequently served stations were in easy walking distance. In 1932, the last full year of operations prior to the Metropolitan Railway being taken into public ownership, the station was used for only 281 passenger journeys and generated just £4 of passenger revenue.

== Brill Tramway ==
On 23 September 1868 the small Aylesbury and Buckingham Railway (A&BR) was opened. It ran south from the London and North Western Railway's Oxford to Bletchley line at Verney Junction, via Quainton Road railway station, to connect with the Great Western Railway at Aylesbury.

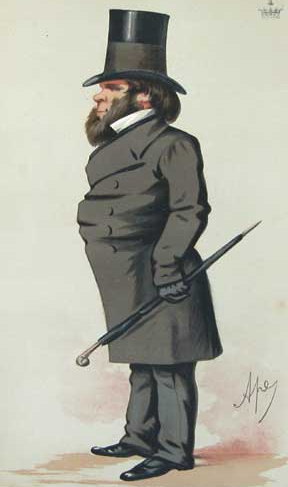
The Duke of Buckingham, founder of the Brill Tramway

The 3rd Duke of Buckingham and Chandos served as Chairman of the London and North Western Railway from 1852 to 1861 and had a long interest in railways. In the early 1870s he decided to build a light railway to carry goods between his estates in Buckinghamshire and the A&BR's line at Quainton Road. (Note: Because the proposed line ran on land owned by the Duke of Buckingham and by the Winwood Charity Trust, who consented to its construction, the line did not need Parliamentary approval and construction could begin immediately.) The first stage of the line, known as the Wotton Tramway, was a 4-mile (6.4 km) line from Quainton Road via Wotton to a coal siding at Kingswood, and opened on 1 April 1871. Intended for use by horse trams, the line was built with longitudinal sleepers to avoid horses tripping on the sleepers.

Lobbying from residents and businesses in the nearby town of Brill led to an extension being built in 1872 from Wotton to Brill railway station, at the foot of Brill Hill three-quarters of a mile (1.2 km) from the hilltop town of Brill itself. Two mixed trains each day were introduced in each direction, and the line was renamed the Brill Tramway. The Duke bought two traction engines from Aveling and Porter modified to work as locomotives for the line, each with a top speed of 8 miles per hour (13 km/h), although a speed limit of 5 miles per hour (8 km/h) was enforced.

The Duke died in 1889, and in 1894 the trustees of his estate set up the Oxford & Aylesbury Tramroad Company (O&ATC) with the intention of extending the line from Brill to Oxford. (Note: Rail services from London to Oxford were very poor at this time; despite being an extremely roundabout route, had the connection from Quainton Road to Oxford been built it would have been the shortest route between Oxford and the City of London.) On 1 September 1894 London's Metropolitan Railway (MR) reached Aylesbury, and shortly afterwards connected to the A&BR line, with local MR services running via Quainton Road to Verney Junction from 1 April 1894. Through trains from the MR's London terminus at Baker Street commenced on 1 January 1897. From 1 December 1899 the MR leased the Brill Tramway from the O&ATC and took over the operation of services on the line, although the Tramway continued to be owned by the O&ATC. (Note: Although from 1899 services were operated by the Metropolitan Railway (the Metropolitan line of the London Underground from July 1933), the track and stations remained owned by the Oxford & Aylesbury Tramroad Company and controlled by the Trustees of the late Earl Temple's Estate. The MR had an option to purchase the line outright, but it was never taken up.)

== Services ==
Waddesdon Road was the first station out from the Quainton Road junction station, in open countryside immediately north of Akeman Street (the A41 road after 1919), about 1.1 miles (1.8 km) southeast of Quainton Road, 1 mile (1.6 km) northwest of the town of Waddesdon, and 1,300 yards (1,200 m) from Waddesdon Manor. The station was initially built with a single low wooden platform, primarily intended for loading and unloading freight. After the 1899 transfer of services to the Metropolitan Railway, the MR introduced a single Brown Marshall passenger carriage on the line; at this time, a short section of platform was raised to conventional height to allow access to the higher doors on the new carriage.

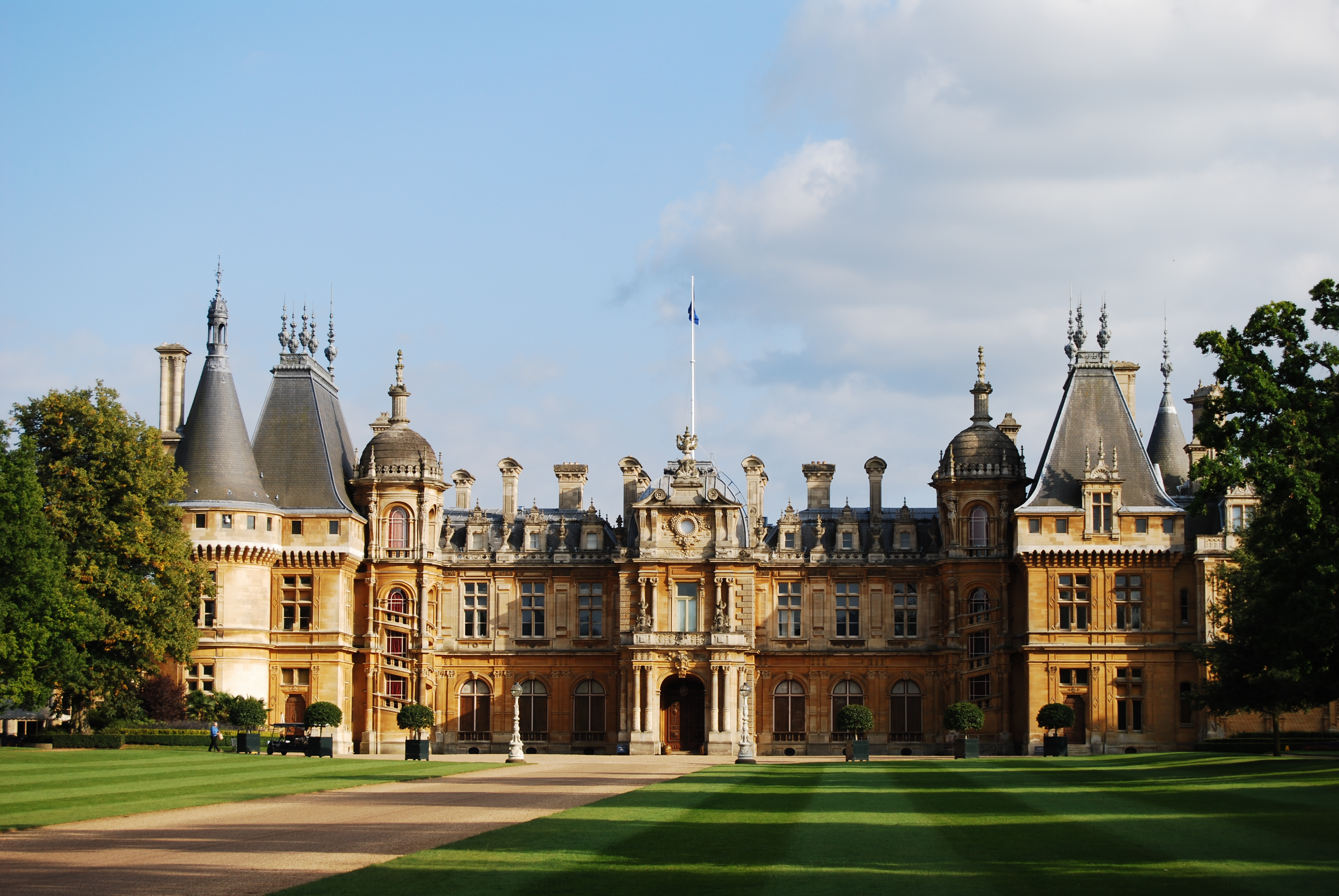
The station was heavily used during the construction of Waddesdon Manor.

Initially known as "Waddesdon Road Siding", the station was renamed "Waddesdon" shortly after opening. On 1 October 1922 the nearby Waddesdon Manor railway station, on the Metropolitan Railway southeast of Quainton Road, was renamed "Waddesdon" and the former Waddesdon station was renamed "Waddesdon Road" in an effort to reduce confusion.

The station was heavily used during the construction of Baron Ferdinand de Rothschild's estate at Waddesdon Manor in the 1870s and 1880s. The brickworks at Brill sent 25,000 bricks per week along the Brill Tramway, and 7,000 tons (7,100 t) of Bath Stone were shipped from Corsham. Aside from goods traffic associated with the building of Waddesdon Manor, the station was little used other than for shipping milk from nearby farms to Aylesbury and London. Inconveniently sited away from any nearby towns and villages, and with the far more frequently served Quainton Road and Waddesdon Manor stations within easy walking distance, the station saw very little passenger use. In 1932, the last year of private operation, Waddesdon Road station saw only 281 passengers and made only £4 (about £200 in 2025) in passenger receipts over the entire year.

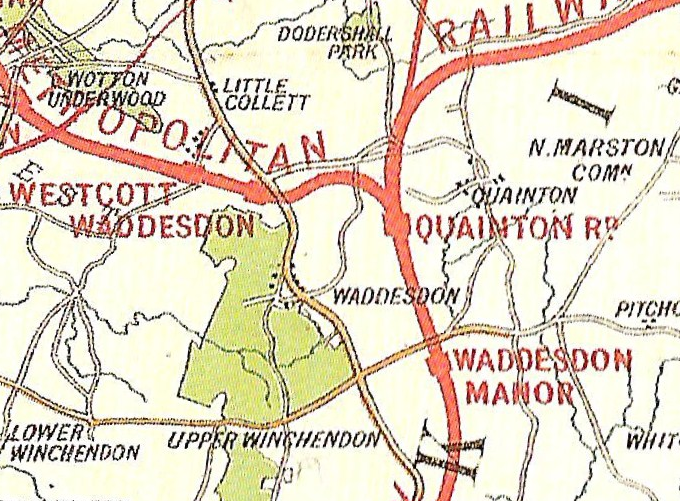
Railway stations and populated areas in the vicinity of Waddesdon, 1903. There was no settlement for which Waddesdon Road ("Waddesdon" on this map) was the most convenient station.

Limited by poor quality locomotives and bumpy, cheaply laid track which followed the contours of the hills, trains ran very slowly in the area: in 1882 trains took 13 minutes to travel the short distance from Waddesdon Road to Quainton Road, and 57 minutes from Waddesdon Road to Brill. From 1872 to 1894 the station was served by two passenger trains per day in each direction, and between 1895 and 1899 the number was increased to three per day. Following the 1899 transfer of services to the Metropolitan Railway, the station was served by four trains per day in each direction until closure in 1935. Improvements to the line carried out at the time of the transfer to the Oxford & Aylesbury Tramroad, and the improved locomotives of the Metropolitan Railway, reduced journey times from Waddesdon Road to Quainton Road and Brill to 6 minutes and 22 minutes respectively.

== Closure ==
On 1 July 1933 the Metropolitan Railway, and all of London's other underground railways except the small Waterloo & City Railway, were taken into public ownership as part of the newly formed London Passenger Transport Board (LPTB). As a consequence, despite its distance from London, Waddesdon Road station became part of the London Underground network. (Note: Despite being a part of the London Underground network, Waddesdon Road—in common with all Metropolitan line stations north of Aylesbury—was never shown on the tube map.)

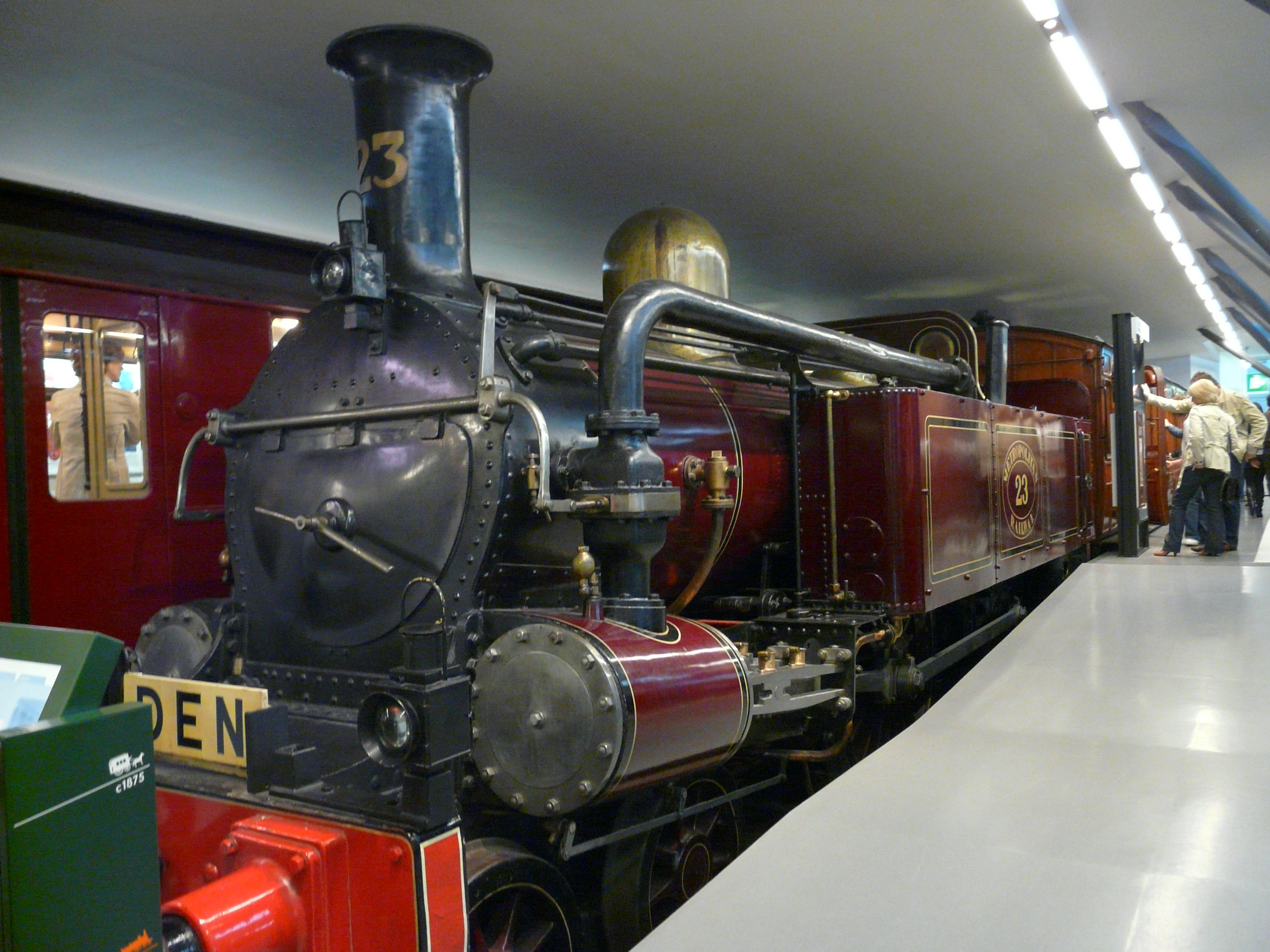
One of the two Metropolitan Railway A Class locomotives in use on the Brill Tramway at the time of its closure

By this time the Brill Tramway was losing significant sums of money. Goods traffic had dwindled, and unlike other areas served by the former Metropolitan Railway there had not been a growth in population and thus passenger numbers remained low. Frank Pick, managing director of the Underground Group from 1928 and the Chief Executive of the LPTB, planned to move the new London Underground away from goods services to concentrate solely on serving passengers. He saw the lines beyond Aylesbury to Brill and Verney Junction as having little future as financially viable passenger routes, concluding that over £2,000 (about £120,000 in 2025) would be saved by closing the Brill Tramway. As a result, the LPTB decided to abandon all passenger services beyond Aylesbury.

The Brill Tramway was closed on 1 December 1935, with the last trains running on 30 November. Upon the withdrawal of London Transport services the railway and stations reverted to the control of the by now almost dormant Oxford & Aylesbury Tramroad Company. With no funds and no rolling stock of its own the O&ATC was unable to operate the line, and on 2 April 1936 the entire infrastructure of the line was sold at auction; the most expensive lot sold was the 37-yard (34 m) platform of Waddesdon Road station, which fetched £7 10s (about £1,070 in 2025). Excluding the station houses at Westcott and Brill, which were sold separately, the auction raised £112 10s (about £6,870 in 2025) in total. No trace of the buildings at Waddesdon Road remains, but the former trackbed is now a public footpath known as the Tramway Walk.

Metropolitan line passenger trains ceased to run north of Aylesbury from 6 July 1936. London and North Eastern Railway services (British Rail from 1948) continued to run from London's Marylebone station over the line to Verney Junction via Quainton Road until March 1963, and the LPTB continued to maintain and to operate freight services over the Verney Junction line until 6 September 1947. After the withdrawal of services from London, Verney Junction station remained open to serve trains on the Oxford–Bletchley line. It was closed following the withdrawal of services between Oxford and Cambridge from 1 January 1968.

== See also ==
- Infrastructure of the Brill Tramway

== Notes and references ==
=== Bibliography ===
- Connor, J. E. (2000). Abandoned Stations on London's Underground. Colchester: Connor & Butler. ISBN 0-947699-30-9. OCLC 59577006.
- Demuth, Tim (2003). The Spread of London's Underground. Harrow Weald: Capital Transport. ISBN 1-85414-266-6.
- Foxell, Clive (2010). The Metropolitan Line: London's first underground railway. Stroud: The History Press. ISBN 978-0-7524-5396-5. OCLC 501397186.
- Horne, Mike (2003). The Metropolitan Line: An illustrated history. Harrow Weald: Capital Transport. ISBN 1-85414-275-5.
- Jackson, Alan (2006). London's Metro-Land. Harrow: Capital History. ISBN 1-85414-300-X. OCLC 144595813.
- Mitchell, Vic; Smith, Keith (2006). Aylesbury to Rugby. Midhurst: Middleton Press. ISBN 1-904474-91-8.
- Oppitz, Leslie (2000). Lost Railways of the Chilterns. Newbury: Countryside Books. ISBN 1-85306-643-5. OCLC 45682620.
- Simpson, Bill (2005). A History of the Metropolitan Railway. Vol. 3. Witney: Lamplight Publications. ISBN 1-899246-13-4.

| Preceding station | Disused railways | Following station |
|---|---|---|
| Westcott; Line and station closed | Metropolitan Railway; Brill Tramway | Quainton Road; Line and station closed |
