= Quainton Road railway station =

Heritage railway station in Buckinghamshire, England

Quainton Road
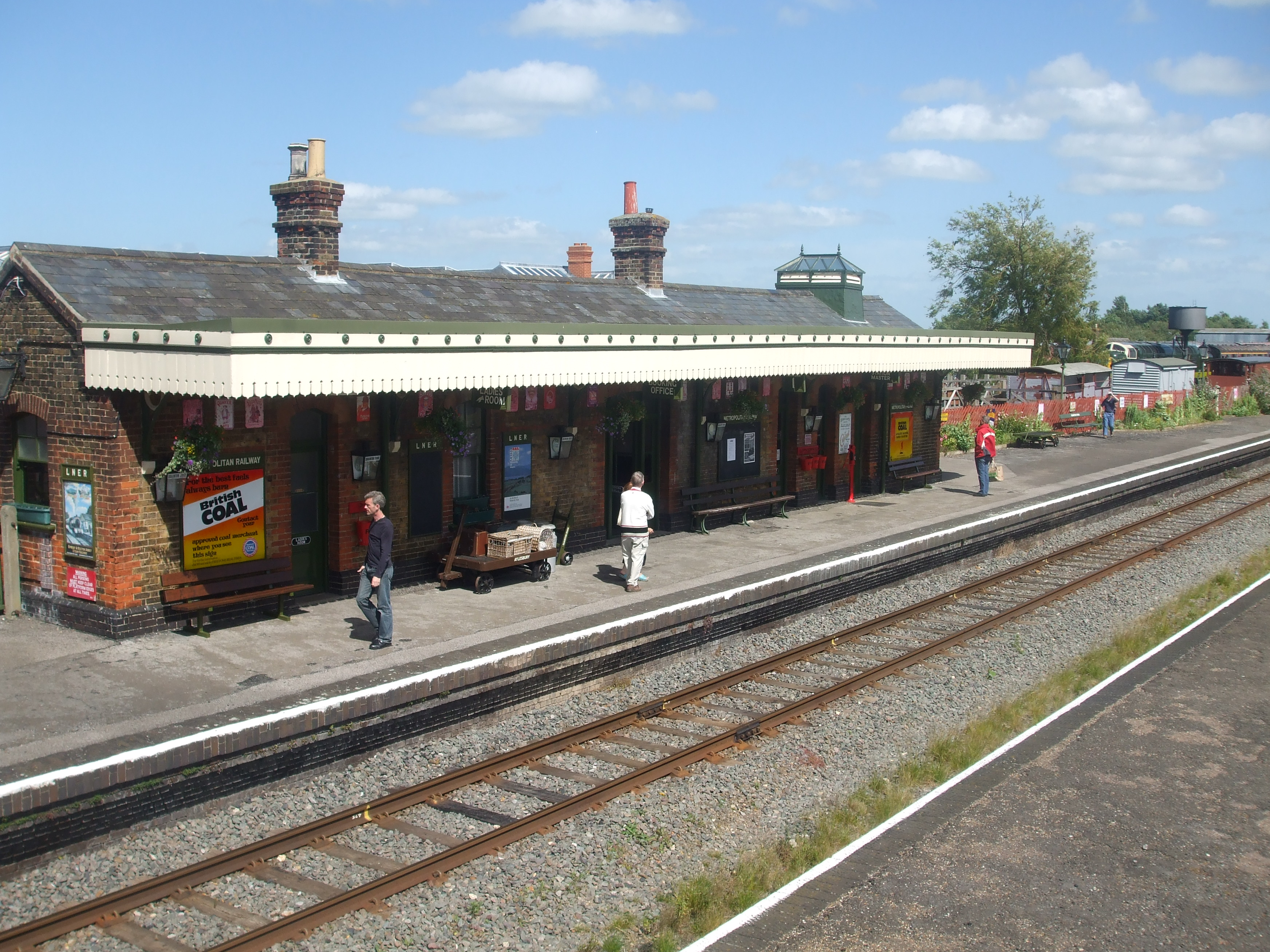
- Up platform and the main station building

General information
- Location: Quainton, Buckinghamshire, England
- Coordinates: 51.86381°N 0.92966°W
- Grid reference: SP738189
- System: Station on heritage railway
- Platforms: 3

History
- Original company: Aylesbury and Buckingham Railway (1868–1891)
- Pre-grouping: Metropolitan Railway (1891–1899)
- Post-grouping: Metropolitan and Great Central Joint Railway (1899–1948), Eastern Region of British Railways (1948–1962), London Midland Region of British Railways (1962–1963)

Key dates
- 23 September 1868: Opened
- 1897: Resited to the up side of the new overbridge
- 6 July 1936: Metropolitan services withdrawn
- 4 March 1963: GCR passenger services withdrawn
- 4 July 1966: GCR goods services withdrawn
- 1969: LRPS/Quainton Railway Society operations commenced
- 1971: Special passenger services started
- 1970s: Buckinghamshire Railway Centre title adopted for QRS operations
Location

Quainton Road railway station served the area of Quainton, in Buckinghamshire, England; it is sited 44 miles (71 km) from London. Built by the Aylesbury and Buckingham Railway, it was the result of pressure from the 3rd Duke of Buckingham to route the railway near his home at Wotton House and to open a railway station at the nearest point to it. Serving a relatively underpopulated area, Quainton Road was a crude railway station, described as "extremely primitive".

It became a junction station in 1871 with the opening of the line to Brill. The Metropolitan Railway took over the Aylesbury and Buckingham Railway in 1891. In 1899, Quainton Road became a main line station with the opening of the Great Central Railway London extension.

In 1933, the Metropolitan Railway was taken into public ownership to become the Metropolitan line of the London Passenger Transport Board's London Underground, including Quainton Road. The LPTB aimed to move away from freight operations and saw no way in which the rural parts of the MR could be made into viable passenger routes. In 1935, the Brill Tramway was closed. From 1936, underground trains were withdrawn north of Aylesbury, leaving the London and North Eastern Railway (successor to the GCR) as the only operator using the station, although underground services were restored for a short period in the 1940s. In 1963, stopping passenger services were withdrawn, but fast passenger trains continued to pass through. In 1966, the line was closed to passenger traffic and local goods trains ceased using the station. The line through the station was singled and used by occasional freight trains only.

In 1969, the Quainton Road Society was formed with the aim of preserving the station. In 1971, it absorbed the London Railway Preservation Society, taking over its collection of historic railway equipment including many locomotives, and passenger and non-passenger rolling stock. The station was fully restored and reopened as a museum, the Buckinghamshire Railway Centre. In addition to the locomotives, stock, and original station buildings, the museum has also acquired the former Oxford Rewley Road station and a London Transport building from Wembley Park, both of which have been reassembled on the site. Although no scheduled trains pass through Quainton Road, the station remains connected to the railway network. Freight trains still use this line and passenger trains still call at the station for special events at the Buckinghamshire Railway Centre.

== Origins ==
On 15 June 1839, entrepreneur and former Member of Parliament (MP) for Buckingham, Sir Harry Verney, 2nd Baronet, opened the Aylesbury Railway. Built under the direction of Robert Stephenson, it connected the London and Birmingham Railway's Cheddington station, on the West Coast Main Line, to Aylesbury High Street in eastern Aylesbury, the first station in the Aylesbury Vale. On 1 October 1863, the Wycombe Railway opened a branch line from Princes Risborough railway station to Aylesbury railway station on the western side of Aylesbury, making Aylesbury the terminus of two small and unconnected branch lines.

Meanwhile, to the north of Aylesbury, the Buckinghamshire Railway was being built by Sir Harry Verney. The scheme consisted of a line running roughly south-west to north-east from Oxford to Bletchley, and a line running south-east from Brackley via Buckingham, joining roughly halfway along the Oxford–Bletchley line. The first section opened on 1 May 1850 and the rest opened on 20 May 1851. The Buckinghamshire Railway intended to extend the line southwards to connect to its station at Aylesbury, but this extension was not built.

Richard Plantagenet Campbell Temple-Nugent-Brydges-Chandos-Grenville (10 September 1823 – 26 March 1889), the only son of Richard Plantagenet Temple-Nugent-Brydges-Chandos-Grenville, 2nd Duke of Buckingham and Chandos, was in serious financial difficulties by the middle of the 19th century. The second Duke had spent heavily on artworks, womanising and attempting to influence elections and, by 1847, he was nicknamed "the Greatest Debtor in the World". Over 40,000 acres (16,000 ha) of the family's 55,000-acre (22,000 ha) estates and their London home at Buckingham House were sold to meet debts, and the family seat of Stowe House was seized by bailiffs as security and its contents sold. The only property remaining in the control of the Grenville family was the family's relatively small ancestral home of Wotton House, and its associated lands around Wotton Underwood in Buckinghamshire. Deeply in debt, the Grenvilles began to look for ways to maximise profits from their remaining farmland around Wotton, and to seek business opportunities in the emerging fields of heavy industry and engineering. Richard Plantagenet Campbell Temple-Nugent-Brydges-Chandos-Grenville, who became the Marquess of Chandos on the death of his grandfather Richard Temple-Nugent-Brydges-Chandos-Grenville, 1st Duke of Buckingham and Chandos in 1839, was appointed chairman of the London and North Western Railway (LNWR) on 27 May 1857. On the death of his father on 29 July 1861, he became the 3rd Duke of Buckingham and Chandos, and resigned from the chairmanship of the LNWR, returning to Wotton House to manage the family's remaining estates.

== Aylesbury and Buckingham Railway ==
On 6 August 1860, the Aylesbury and Buckingham Railway (A&B), with the third Duke (then still Marquess of Chandos) as chairman and Sir Harry Verney as deputy chairman, was incorporated by Act of Parliament with the object of connecting the Buckinghamshire Railway (by now operated by the LNWR) to Aylesbury. The 2nd Duke used his influence to ensure the new route would run via Quainton, near his remaining estates around Wotton, instead of the intended more direct route via Pitchcott. Beset by financial difficulties, the line took over eight years to build, eventually opening on 23 September 1868. The new line was connected to the Wycombe Railway's Aylesbury station, and joined the existing Buckinghamshire Railway lines at the point where the Oxford–Bletchley line and the line to Buckingham already met. Verney Junction railway station was built at the point where the lines joined, named after Sir Harry who owned the land on which it was built, since there was no nearby town. Aylesbury now had railways to the east, north and south-west, but no line south-east towards London and the Channel ports.

Quainton Road station was built on a curve in the line at the nearest point to the Duke's estates at Wotton. 6 miles (9.7 km) north-west of Aylesbury, it was south-west of the small village of Quainton and immediately north-west of the road connecting Quainton to Akeman Street. (Note: Although officially called "Quainton Road", the names "Quainton Road" and "Quainton" were used indiscriminately in official documents for the first station. The second (1897) station was always referred to as "Quainton Road".) The railway towards Aylesbury crossed the road via a level crossing immediately south-east of the station. The Aylesbury and Buckingham Railway had spent most of their limited budget on the construction of the line itself. Details of the design of the original Quainton Road station are lost, but it is likely that the station had a single timber-covered earth platform and minimal buildings; it was described in 1890 as being extremely primitive.

== Wotton Tramway ==
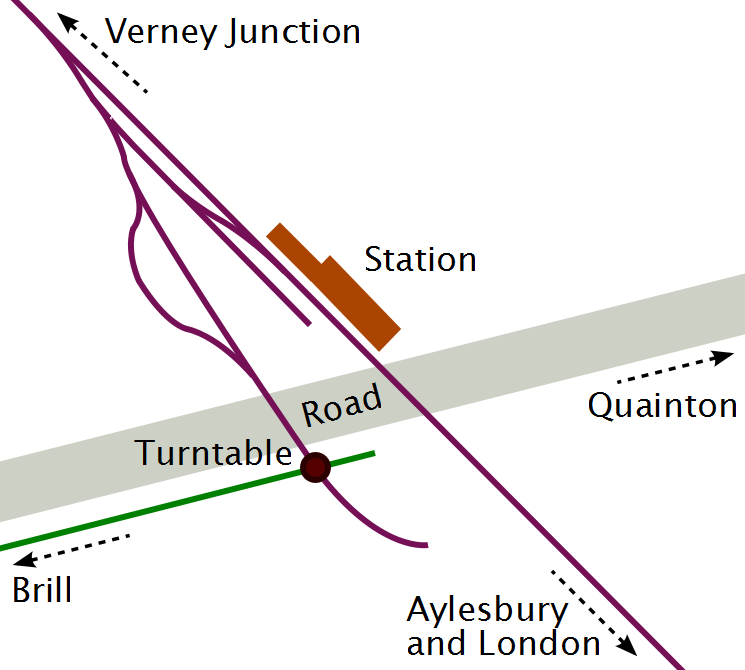
A complex arrangement of sidings, level crossings and a turntable were the only link between the Wotton Tramway and the Aylesbury and Buckingham Railway at Quainton Road.

With a railway now running near the boundary of the Wotton House estate at Quainton Road, the 3rd Duke decided to open a small-scale agricultural railway to connect the estate to the railway. The line was intended purely for the transport of construction materials and agricultural produce, and not passengers. The line was to run roughly south-west from Quainton Road to a new railway station near Wotton Underwood. Just west of the station at Wotton the line split: one section would run west to Wood Siding near Brill; a short stub called Church Siding would run north-west into the village of Wotton Underwood itself, terminating near the parish church, and a one mile 57 chain (one mile 1,254 yards; 2.8 km) siding would run north to a coal siding near Kingswood.

He extended it soon afterwards to provide a passenger service to the town of Brill, and the tramway was converted to locomotive operation, known as the Brill Tramway. All goods to and from the Brill Tramway passed through Quainton Road, making it relatively heavily used despite its geographical isolation, and traffic increased further when construction began on Ferdinand de Rothschild's mansion of Waddesdon Manor. The plan of extending the Brill Tramway to Oxford, which would have made Quainton Road a major junction station, was abandoned.

Instead, the Aylesbury and Buckingham Railway and the Brill Tramway were absorbed by London's Metropolitan Railway (MR), which already operated the line from Aylesbury to London. The MR rebuilt Quainton Road and re-sited it to a more convenient location, allowing through running between the Brill Tramway and the Aylesbury and Buckingham Railway. When the Great Central Railway (GCR) from the north of England opened, Quainton Road became a significant junction at which trains from four directions met, and by far the busiest of the MR's rural stations.

Construction began on the line on 8 September 1870. It was built as cheaply as possible, using the cheapest available materials and winding around hills wherever feasible to avoid expensive earthworks. The station platforms were crude earth banks 6 inches (150 mm) high, held in place by wooden planks. As the Duke intended that the line be worked by horses, it was built with longitudinal sleepers to reduce the risk of them tripping.

On 1 April 1871, the section between Quainton Road and Wotton was formally opened by the Duke in a brief ceremony. (Note: By the time of the formal opening, sections of the line were already in use for the transport of construction materials.) At the time of its opening, the line was unnamed, although it was referred to as "The Quainton Tramway" in internal correspondence. (Note: When built, the Duke of Buckingham's tramway had no official name; it was referred to in internal correspondence as "The Quainton Tramway". Following the 1872 extension and conversion to passenger use, it was officially named the "Wotton Tramway". On 1 April 1894, the Wotton Tramway was taken over by the Oxford & Aylesbury Tramroad, and retained the O&AT name officially until closure in 1935 despite never running either to Oxford or to Aylesbury. It was commonly known as the Brill Tramway from 1872 onwards (and referred to as such in some official documents such as the agreement establishing the Metropolitan and Great Central Joint Committee), and as the Metropolitan Railway Brill Branch from 1899 to 1935, but neither of these were official names.) The extension from Wotton to Wood Siding was complete by 17 June 1871; the opening date of the northern branch to Kingswood is not recorded, but it was not yet fully open in February 1873. The London and North Western Railway immediately began to operate a dedicated service from Quainton Road, with three vans per week of milk collected from the Wotton estate shipped to Broad Street. Passengers were not carried, other than estate employees and people accompanying livestock.

The tramway did not link to the A&B, but had its own station at Quainton Road at a right angle to the A&B. A 13-foot (4.0 m) diameter turntable at the end of the tramway linked to a spur from the A&B. This spur ran behind a goods shed, joining the A&B line to the northwest of the road. The Tramway had no buildings at Quainton Road, using the A&B's facilities when necessary. As the tramway ran on the east side of the road, opposite the station, the spur line had its own level crossing to reach the main line. In 1871, permission was granted to build a direct connection between the two lines, but it was not built.

=== Expansion of the Wotton Tramway ===
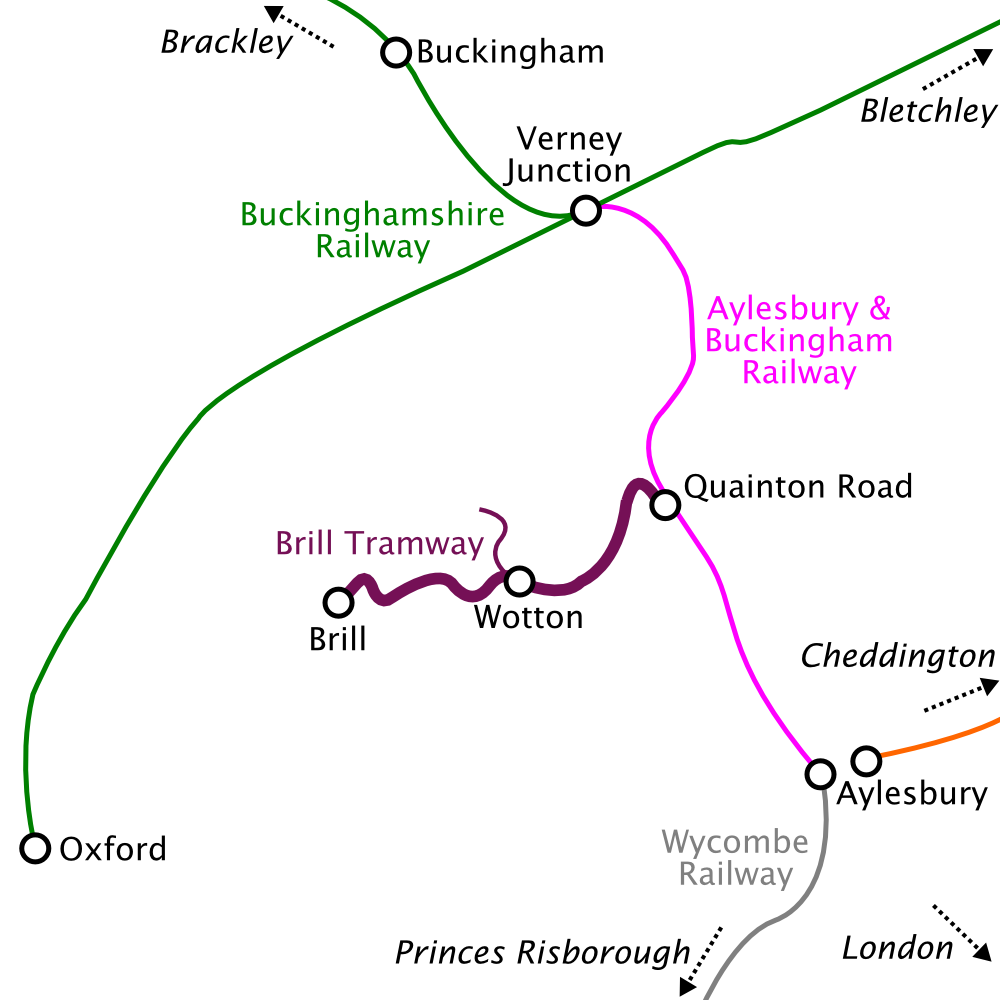
Railways in and around the Aylesbury Vale, 1872. The important town of Aylesbury was served by railways in all directions other than southeast towards London and the Channel ports. Quainton Road was the only connection between the Brill Tramway and the rest of the railway network. (Note: Not to scale. Only significant stations and junctions are marked. Lines running out of Oxford other than those which ran through the Aylesbury Vale are not shown.)

In late 1871, the residents of Brill, the former seat of the Mercian kings and the only significant town near Wotton House, petitioned the Duke to extend the route to Brill and to run a passenger service on the line. In January 1872, a passenger timetable was published for the first time, and the line was officially named the "Wotton Tramway", but it was commonly known as the "Brill Tramway" from its opening to passengers until closure. The new terminus of Brill opened in March 1872. With horses unable to cope with the loads being carried, the Tramway was upgraded for locomotive use. The lightly laid track with longitudinal sleepers limited the locomotive weight to a maximum of nine tons, lighter than almost all locomotives then available, so it was not possible to use standard locomotives. Two traction engines converted for railway use were bought from Aveling and Porter at a cost of £398 (about £38,900 as of 2025) each. The locomotives were chosen on grounds of weight and reliability, and had a top speed on the level of only 8 miles per hour (13 km/h), taking 95–98 minutes to travel the six miles (10 km) between Brill and Quainton Road, an average speed of 4 miles per hour (6.4 km/h).

The line was used heavily for the shipment of bricks from the brickworks around Brill, and of cattle and milk from the dairy farms on the Wotton estate. By 1875, the line was carrying around 40,000 gallons (180,000 litres) of milk each year. Delivery of linseed cake to the dairy farms and of coal to the area's buildings were also important uses of the line. The line also began to carry large quantities of manure from London to the area's farms, carrying 3,200 tons (3,300 tonnes) in 1872. As it was the only physical link between the Tramway and the national railway network, almost all of this traffic passed through Quainton Road station.

By the mid-1870s, the slow speed of the Aveling and Porter locomotives and their unreliability and inability to handle heavy loads were recognised as major problems for the Tramway. In 1874, Ferdinand de Rothschild bought a 2,700-acre (1,100 ha) site near the Tramway's Waddesdon station to use as a site for his country mansion of Waddesdon Manor. The Tramway's management recognised that the construction works would lead to a significant increase in the haulage of heavy goods, and that the Aveling and Porter engines would be unable to cope with the increased loads.

The newly established engineering firm of W. G. Bagnall wrote to the Duke offering to hire a locomotive to him for trials. The offer was accepted, and on 18 December 1876, the locomotive was delivered. The tests were generally successful and an order was placed to buy a locomotive from Bagnall for £640 (about £64,500 in 2025) which was delivered on 28 December 1877. With trains now hauled by the Bagnall locomotive (the Kingswood branch generally remained worked by horses, and occasionally by the Aveling and Porter engines), traffic levels soon rose. Milk traffic rose from 40,000 gallons carried in 1875 to 58,000 gallons (260,000 L; 70,000 US gal) in 1879, and in 1877, the Tramway carried a total of 20,994 tons (21,331 t) of goods. In early 1877, the Tramway was shown on Bradshaw maps for the first time, and from May 1882 Bradshaw included its timetable.

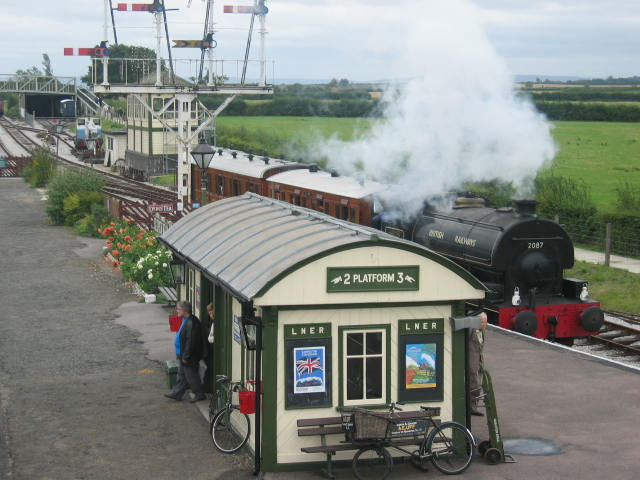
Quainton Road station in 2006, showing the platform formerly used by trains to Brill. The building on the platform now houses an exhibition on the Brill Tramway.

Although the introduction of the Bagnall locomotives and the traffic generated by the works at Waddesdon Manor had boosted the line's fortunes, it remained in serious financial difficulty. The only connection with the national railway network was by the turntable at Quainton Road. Although the 3rd Duke of Buckingham was both the owner of the Wotton Tramway and Chairman of the A&B, the latter regarded the Tramway as a nuisance, and in the 1870s, pursued a policy of charging disproportionately high fees for through traffic between the Tramway and the main line, with the intention of forcing the Tramway out of business. A&B trains would deliberately miss connections with the Tramway, causing milk shipped via Quainton Road to become unsellable.

The Tramway sought legal advice and was informed that the Duke would be likely to win a legal action against the A&B. However, the A&B was in such a precarious financial position that any successful legal action against it would likely have forced its through Quainton Road to close, severing the Tramway's connection with the national network. Many Tramway passengers changed trains at Quainton Road to continue their journey on the A&B; in 1885, 5,192 passengers did so. The Tramway's management suggested that the A&B subsidise the Tramway to the sum of £25 (about £2,800 in 2025) per month to allow passenger services to continue, but the A&B agreed to pay only £5 (about £600 in 2025) per month. By the mid-1880s, the Tramway was finding it difficult to cover the operating expenses of either goods or passenger operations.

== Metropolitan Railway takeover of the Aylesbury and Buckingham Railway ==
Charles Pearson (1793–1862) had proposed the idea of an underground railway connecting the City of London with the relatively distant main line termini in around 1840. Construction began in 1860. On 9 January 1863, the line opened as the Metropolitan Railway (MR), the world's first underground passenger railway. The MR was successful and grew steadily, extending its services and acquiring other local railways north and west of London. In 1872, Edward Watkin (1819–1901) was appointed its chairman. A director of many railway companies, he had a vision of unifying a string of railways to create a single line from Manchester via London, to an intended Channel Tunnel and on to France. In 1873, Watkin entered negotiations to take control of the A&B and the section of the former Buckinghamshire Railway north from Verney Junction to Buckingham. He planned to extend the MR north from London to Aylesbury and the Tramway southwest to Oxford, creating a through route from London to Oxford. Rail services between Oxford and London at this time were poor: although still an extremely roundabout route, this scheme would have formed the shortest route from London to Oxford, Aylesbury, Buckingham and Stratford upon Avon. The Duke of Buckingham was enthusiastic, and authorisation was sought from Parliament. Parliament did not share the enthusiasm of Watkin and the Duke; in 1875, the Buckinghamshire and Northamptonshire Union Railway Bill was rejected. Watkin did, however, receive consent in 1881 to extend the MR to Aylesbury.

== Wotton Tramway Oxford extension scheme ==
Manning Wardle Huddersfield at Quainton Road in the late 1890s with the Wotton Tramway's 1870s passenger coach, an 1895 Oxford & Aylesbury Tramroad passenger coach and a goods wagon loaded with milk cans

With the MR extension to Aylesbury approved, in March 1883, the Duke announced his own scheme to extend the Tramway to Oxford. The turntable at Quainton Road would be replaced by a junction to the south of the turntable to allow through running of trains. The stretch from Quainton Road to Brill would be straightened and improved to main line standards, and the little-used stations at Waddesdon Road and Wood Siding would be closed. From Brill, the line would pass in a 1,650-yard (1,510 m) tunnel through Muswell Hill to the south of Brill, and on via Boarstall before crossing from Buckinghamshire into Oxfordshire at Stanton St. John, calling at Headington on the outskirts of Oxford and terminating at a station to be built in the back garden of 12 High Street, St Clement's, near Magdalen Bridge.

At 23 miles (37 km), the line would have been the shortest route by far between Oxford and Aylesbury, compared with 28 miles (45 km) via the Great Western Railway (GWR), which had absorbed the Wycombe Railway, and 34 miles (55 km) via the Aylesbury and Buckingham Railway and the LNWR. The Act of Parliament authorising the scheme received the Royal Assent on 20 August 1883, and the new Oxford, Aylesbury and Metropolitan Junction Railway Company, including the Duke of Buckingham, Ferdinand de Rothschild and Harry Verney among its directors, was created. The scheme caught the attention of the expansionist Metropolitan Railway, who paid for the survey to be conducted. Despite the scheme's powerful backers, the expensive Muswell Hill tunnel deterred investors and the company found it difficult to raise capital. De Rothschild promised to lend money for the scheme in return for guarantees that the line would include a passenger station at Westcott, and that the Duke would press the A&B into opening a station at the nearest point to Waddesdon Manor. Waddesdon Manor railway station was duly opened on 1 January 1897.

== Oxford & Aylesbury Tramroad ==
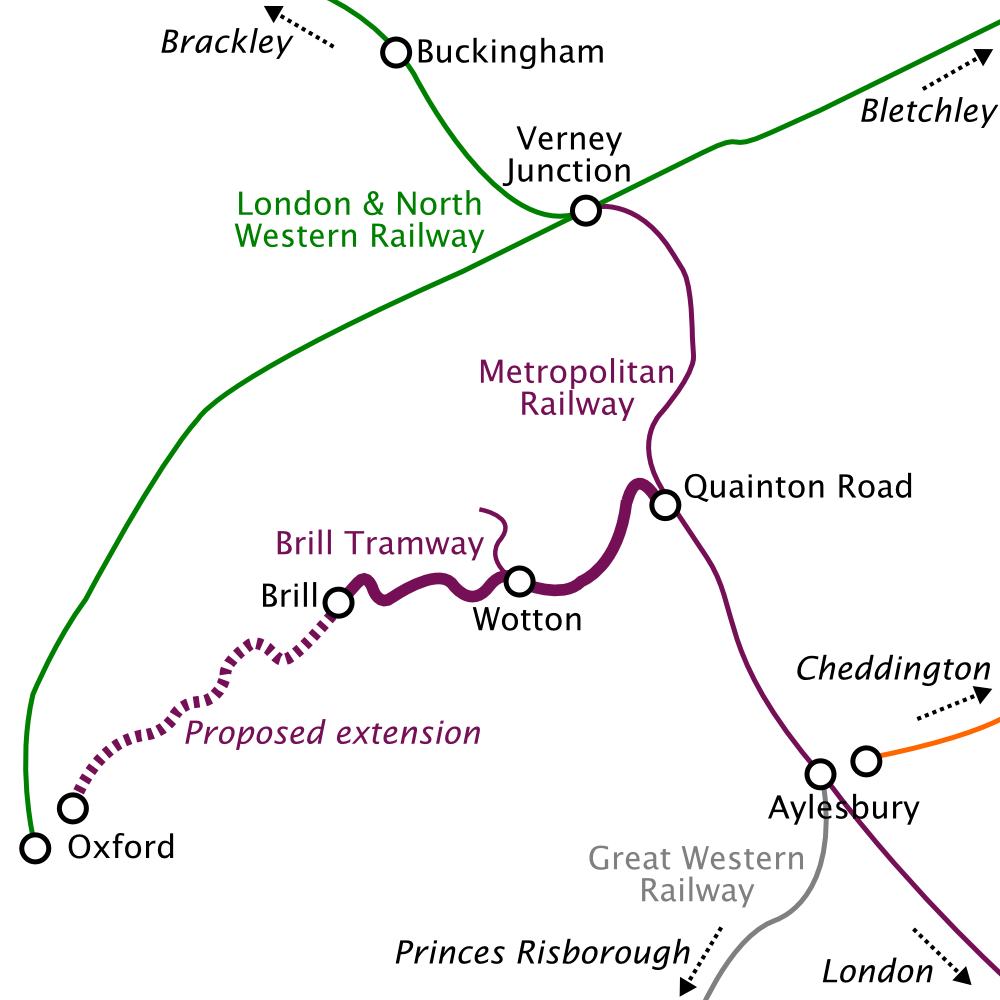
Railways in and around the Aylesbury Vale, 1894. The proposed new route from Aylesbury to Oxford via Brill was significantly shorter than the existing Verney Junction route, and would have made Quainton Road a major interchange.

The new company was unable to raise sufficient investment to begin construction of the Oxford extension, and had been given only five years by Parliament to build it. On 7 August 1888, less than two weeks before the authorisation was due to expire, the directors of the Oxford, Aylesbury and Metropolitan Junction Railway Company received the Royal Assent for a revised and much cheaper version. To be called the Oxford & Aylesbury Tramroad (O&AT), this envisaged the extension being built to the same light specifications as the existing Tramway.

On 26 March 1889, the third Duke of Buckingham and Chandos died, (Note: The Dukedom of Buckingham and Chandos was a title inherited only in the male line. As the 3rd Duke had three daughters but no son, the title became extinct. The 1st Duke had also held the title of Earl Temple of Stowe, which descended through the heirs of his relatives should the male line become extinct. Consequently, on the third Duke's death this title, along with most of the Wotton estate, passed to his nephew William Temple-Gore-Langton who became the fourth Earl. Although Wotton House and the bulk of the estate passed to the Earl, some parts of the Tramway, including the station cottages at Westcott and Brill, were inherited by the third Duke's daughter Mary Morgan-Grenville, 11th Lady Kinloss. The Earl's heir, Algernon William Stephen Temple-Gore-Langton, 5th Earl Temple of Stowe, bought these properties from Lady Kinloss in 1903.) aged 65. (Note: A special train brought the 3rd Duke's body from London to Quainton Road. From Quainton Road he was taken to Stowe for the service, and on to the family vault at Wotton. Five carriages provided by the LNWR carried mourners to Church Siding, near Wotton Underwood church. Another carried a company of the Royal Buckinghamshire Yeomanry, closely associated with the Grenville family and the upkeep of which had helped to bankrupt the 2nd Duke. The second train was delayed on the A&B, arriving late to the burial.) By this time the construction of the MR extension to Aylesbury was well underway and, on 1 July 1891, the MR formally absorbed the A&B. Sir Harry Verney died on 12 February 1894, and on 31 March 1894, the MR took over the operation of the A&B from the GWR. On 1 July 1894, the MR extension to Aylesbury was completed, giving the MR a unified route from London to Verney Junction. The MR embarked on a programme of upgrading and rebuilding the stations along the newly acquired line.

Construction from Brill to Oxford had not yet begun. Further Acts of Parliament were granted in 1892 and 1894, varying the proposed route slightly and allowing for its electrification, but no work was carried out other than some preliminary surveying. On 1 April 1894, with the proposed extension to Oxford still intended, the O&AT exercised a clause of the 1888 Act and took over the Tramway. Work began on upgrading the line in preparation for the extension. The line from Quainton Road to Brill was relaid with improved rails on transverse sleepers, replacing the original flimsy rails and longitudinal sleepers. At around this time, two Manning Wardle locomotives were brought into use. (Note: The date of introduction of the Manning Wardle locomotives is not recorded, but they were in use by 19 September 1894.)

== Resiting ==
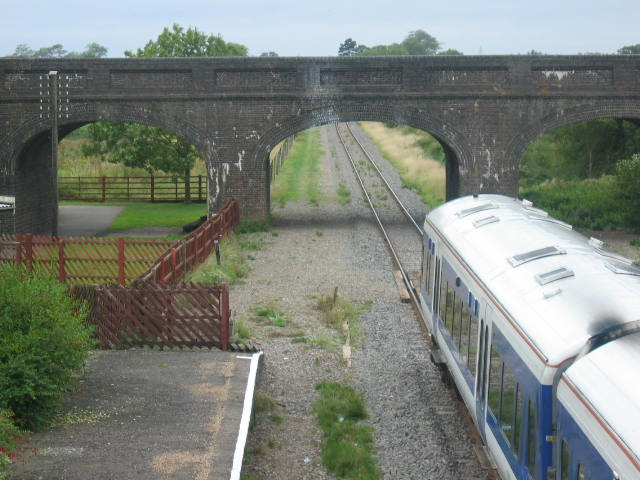
The road from Quainton now crosses the railway line via an 1896 bridge immediately north-west of the station platforms.

The rebuilding of the Tramway greatly improved service speeds, reducing journey times between Quainton Road and Brill to between 35 and 43 minutes. The population of the area had remained low; in 1901, Brill had a population of only 1,206. Passenger traffic remained a relatively insignificant part of the Tramway's business and, in 1898, passenger receipts were only £24 per month (about £2,700 in 2025).

Quainton Road had seen little change since its construction by the A&B in 1868 and, in 1890 was described by The Times as "one of the most primitive-looking stations in the British Isles". While the line to Brill was being upgraded, the MR were rebuilding and re-siting Quainton Road as part of its improvement programme, freeing space for a direct link between the former A&B and the O&AT to be built. The new station was re-sited to the south-east of the road, on the same side as the turntable connection with the Tramway. The new station had two platforms on the former A&B line and a third platform for Brill trains. In 1896, the level crossings around the station were replaced by a road bridge over the railway. A curve between the former A&B and the Tramway opened on 1 January 1897, allowing through running without the need to turn the engine and carriages individually on the turntable for the first time. The MR made a concerted effort to generate passenger traffic on the line. From 1910 to 1914, Pullman cars operated between Aldgate and Verney Junction, calling at Quainton Road, and a luxurious hotel was built in the new village of Verney Junction. (Note: Although Verney Junction closed in 1968, the station hotel, now the Verney Arms, remains open as a restaurant.)

== Metropolitan Railway takeover of Oxford & Aylesbury Tramroad services ==
By 1899, the MR and the O&AT were cooperating closely. Although the line had been upgraded in preparation for the Oxford extension and had been authorised as a railway in 1894, construction of the extension had yet to begin. On 27 November, the MR arranged to lease the Tramway from the O&AT, for an annual fee of £600 (about £67,000 in 2025) with an option to buy the line outright. From 1 December 1899, the MR took over all operations on the Tramway. The O&AT's single passenger coach, a relic of Wotton Tramway days, was removed from its wheels and used as a platelayer's hut at Brill. An elderly Brown, Marshalls and Co passenger coach was transferred to the line to replace it, and a section of each platform was raised to accommodate the higher doors of this coach, using earth and old railway sleepers. (Note: It was too wide to travel safely along the curved platform at Quainton Road, forcing the MR to slew the track.)

D class locomotives, introduced by the MR to improve services on the former Tramway line, damaged the track, and in 1910, the line between Quainton Road and Brill was relaid to MR standards using old track removed from the inner London MR route, still considered adequate for light use on a rural branch line. Following this track upgrading, the speed limit was increased to 25 miles per hour (40 km/h). The MR was unhappy with the performance and safety record of the D Class locomotives, and sold them to other railways between 1916 and 1922, replacing them with A class locomotives.

== Great Central Railway ==
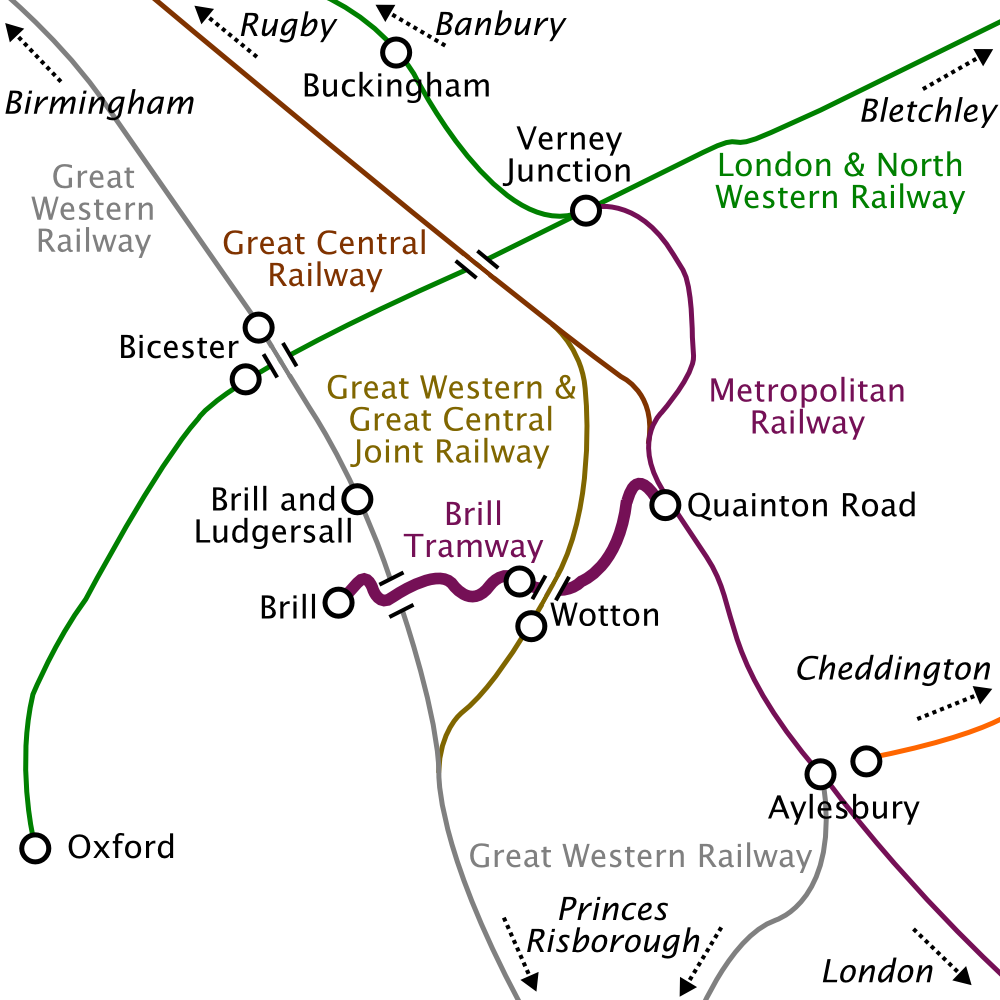
Railways in and around the Aylesbury Vale, 1910–35. With the opening of the Great Central Railway, railway lines from four different directions met at Quainton Road, but the new routes to the west were reducing the significance of Quainton Road as an interchange.

In 1893, another of Edward Watkin's railways, the Manchester, Sheffield and Lincolnshire Railway, had been authorised to build a new 92-mile (148 km) line from Annesley in Nottinghamshire south to Quainton Road. Watkin had intended to run services from Manchester and Sheffield via Quainton Road and along the MR to Baker Street. Following Watkin's retirement in 1894, the Manchester, Sheffield and Lincolnshire Railway obtained permission for a separate station in London near Baker Street at Marylebone, and the line was renamed the Great Central Railway (GCR). The new line joined the MR just north of Quainton Road, and opened to passengers on 15 March 1899.

Although it served a lightly populated area, the opening of the GCR made Quainton Road an important junction station at which four railway lines met. The number of passengers using the station rose sharply. It had many passengers in comparison to other stations in the area. In 1932, the last year of private operation, the station saw 10,598 passenger journeys, earning a total of £601 (about £36,300 in 2025) in passenger receipts.

Quainton Road was by far the busiest of the MR's rural passenger stations north of Aylesbury. Verney Junction railway station saw only 943 passenger journeys in the same year, and the five other stations on the Brill Tramway had a combined passenger total of 7,761. (Note: Waddesdon Road, Westcott, Wotton, Wood Siding and Brill.)

=== Great Western and Great Central Joint Railway ===
Following Watkin's retirement, relations between the GCR and the MR deteriorated badly. The GCR route to London ran over the MR from Quainton Road to London, and to reduce reliance on the hostile MR, GCR General Manager William Pollitt decided to create a link with the Great Western Railway and a route into London that bypassed the MR. In 1899, the Great Western and Great Central Joint Railway began construction of a new line, commonly known as the Alternative Route, to link the GWR at Princes Risborough to the GCR at Grendon Underwood, about three miles (5 km) north of Quainton Road. Although formally an independent company, the new line was operated as a part of the GCR. A substantial part of GCR traffic to and from London was diverted onto the Alternative Route, reducing the significance of Quainton Road as an interchange and damaging the profitability of the MR. (Note: Although the diversion of GCR traffic onto the Alternative Route damaged the MR's railway income, much of the MR's income came from property development in the areas served by the railway. This division increased in profitability after the opening of the Alternative Route; the housing developments, most of which were near the MR line, increased in value following the reduction in smoke and noise from trains.)

== London Transport ==
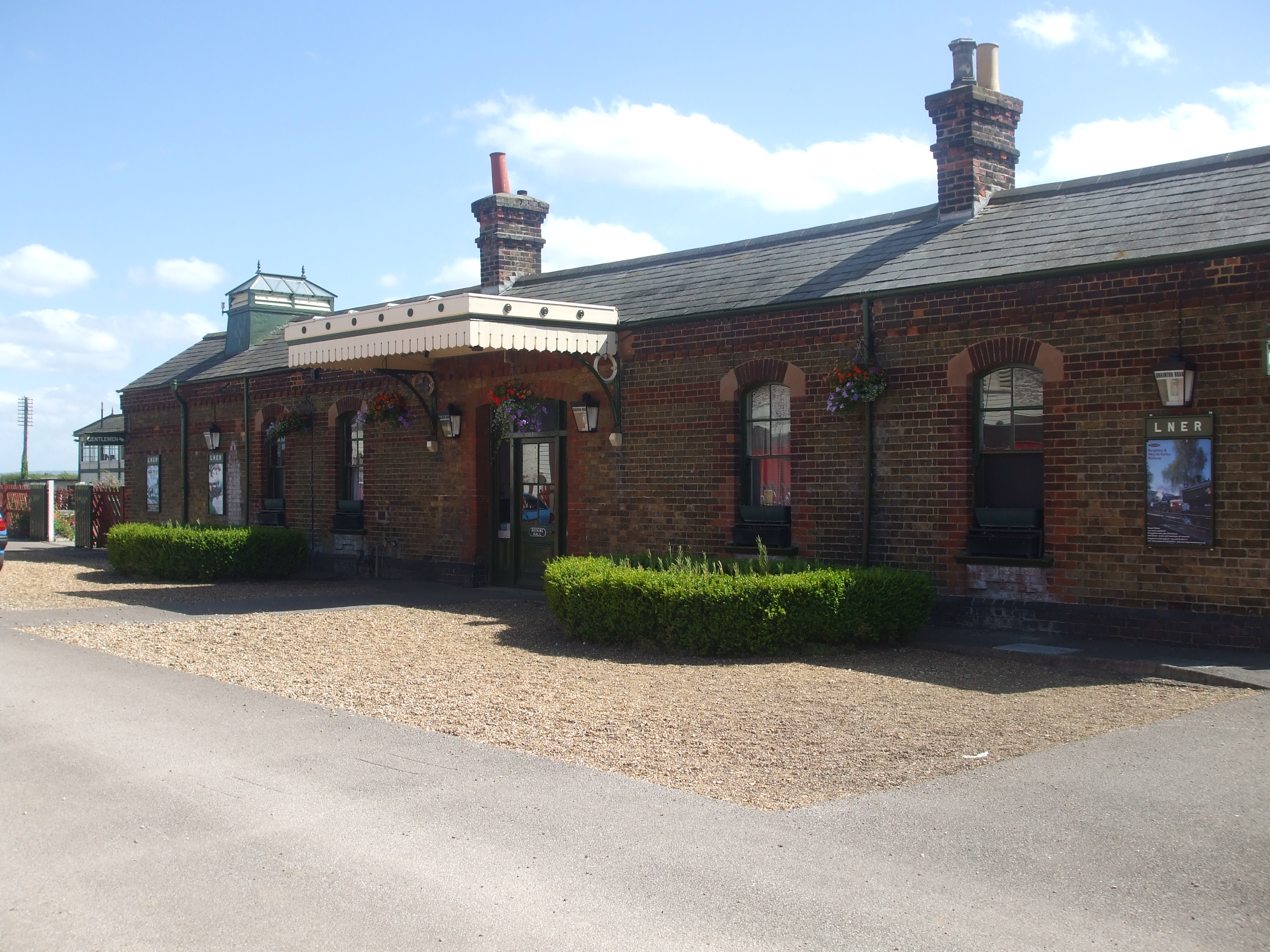
The main building of the second Quainton Road station

On 1 July 1933, the MR, along with London's other underground railways aside from the short Waterloo & City Railway, was taken into public ownership as part of the newly formed London Passenger Transport Board (LPTB). Despite being 44 miles (71 km) from London, Quainton Road became part of the London Underground network. (Note: In common with all Underground stations north of Aylesbury, Quainton Road was never shown on the tube map.) By this time, the lines from Quainton Road to Verney Junction and Brill were in severe decline. Competition from the newer lines and from improving road haulage had drawn away much of the Tramway's custom in particular, and Brill trains would often run without a single passenger.

Frank Pick, managing director of the Underground Group from 1928 and the chief executive of the LPTB, aimed to move the network away from freight services and concentrate on the electrification and improvement of the core routes in London. He saw the lines beyond Aylesbury via Quainton Road to Brill and Verney Junction as having little future as financially viable passenger routes. On 1 June 1935, the LPTB gave the required six months' notice to the O&AT that it intended to terminate operations on the Brill Tramway.

== Closure ==
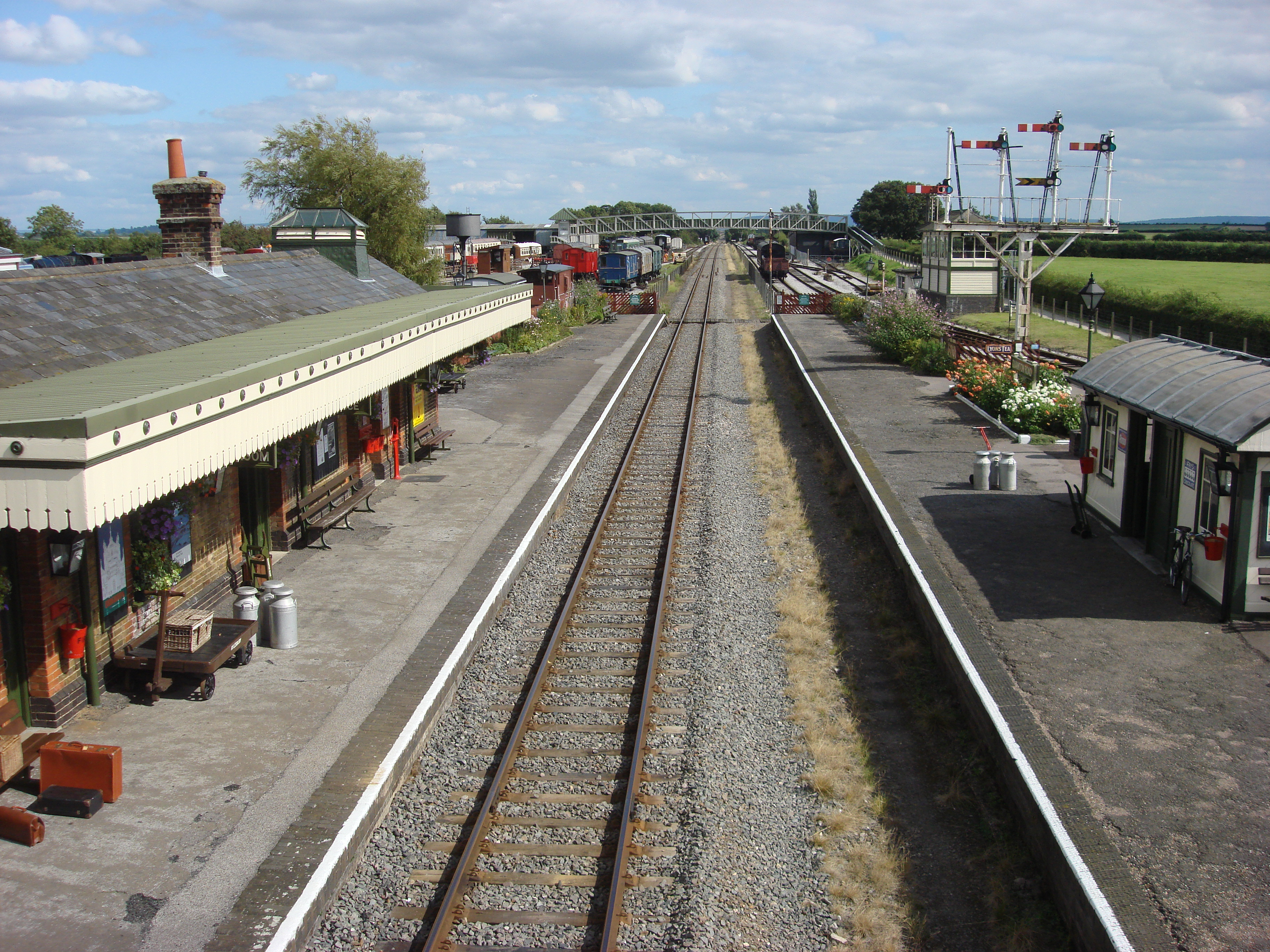
The line through the station was reduced to a single track in the 1960s

The last scheduled passenger train on the Brill Tramway left Quainton Road in the afternoon of 30 November 1935. Hundreds of people gathered, and a number of members of the Oxford University Railway Society travelled from Oxford in an effort to buy the last ticket. Accompanied by firecrackers and fog signals, the train ran to Brill, where the passengers posed for a photograph. Late that evening, a two-coach staff train pulled out of Brill, accompanied by a band bearing a white flag and playing Auld Lang Syne. The train stopped at each station, picking up the staff, documents and valuables from each. At 11.45pm the train arrived at Quainton Road, greeted by hundreds of locals and railway enthusiasts. At the stroke of midnight, the rails connecting the Tramway to the main line were ceremonially severed.

Quainton Road remained open, but with the closure of the Brill Tramway it was no longer a significant junction. The line to Verney Junction was closed to passengers on 6 July 1936. London Transport passenger services beyond Aylesbury were withdrawn, leaving the former GCR (part of the London and North Eastern Railway after 1923) as the only passenger services to Quainton Road. .A connection between the GCR and the former Buckinghamshire Railway at Calvert was opened in 1942,.London Transport services were briefly restored in 1943 with the extension of the Metropolitan line's London–Aylesbury service to Quainton Road, but this service was withdrawn once more in 1948.

London Transport reduced the A&B route between Quainton Road and Verney Junction to a single track in 1939–40. LT continued to operate freight services until 6 September 1947, when the Quainton Road–Verney Junction route was closed altogether, (Note: Although goods services on the original Verney Junction line stopped in 1947, the track was not removed until 1953. It was used as a long storage siding between those dates.)

Quainton Road closed to passengers on 4 March 1963 and to goods on 4 July 1966. On 3 September 1966, passenger services on the GCR line from Aylesbury to Rugby were withdrawn, leaving only the stretch from Aylesbury to Calvert, running through the now-closed Quainton Road, open for freight trains. This was reduced to a single track shortly afterwards. The signal box at Quainton Road was abandoned on 13 August 1967, and the points connecting to the goods yard were disconnected.

Preceding station	Historical railways	Following station
Calvert; Line and station closed	Great Central Railway; Great Central Main Line	Waddesdon Manor; Line and station closed
	Disused railways	
Granborough Road; Line and station closed	Metropolitan Railway; Metropolitan and Great Central Joint Railway	Waddesdon Manor; Line and station closed
Waddesdon Road; Line and station closed	Metropolitan Railway; Brill Tramway	Terminus

== Restoration ==
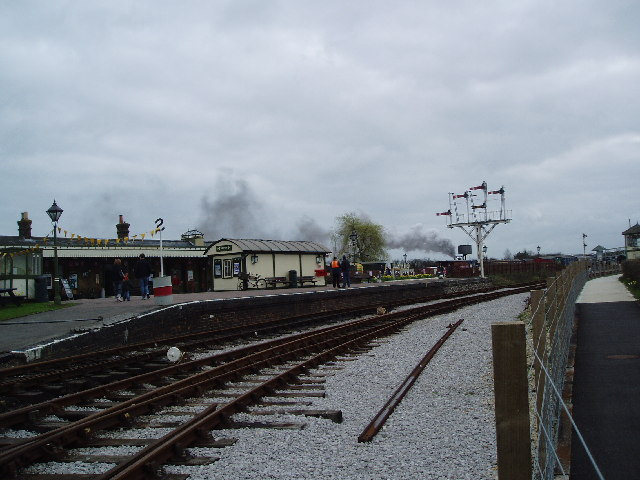
The curved Brill platform at Quainton Road. The short stretch of rail from this platform is the only surviving part of the Brill Tramway.

While other closed stations on the former MR lines north of Aylesbury were generally demolished or sold, in 1969 the Quainton Railway Society was formed to operate a working museum at the station. On 24 April 1971, the society absorbed the London Railway Preservation Society, taking custody of its collection of historic railway equipment. (Note: The London Railway Preservation Society had built up an extensive collection of artefacts since 1963, including the largest collection of London and North Western Railway memorabilia, but had no place to display them. Prior to the LRPS's absorption by the Quainton Railway Society, its collection was held in government depots at Luton and Bishop's Stortford.) The station was maintained in working order and used as a bookshop and ticket office; the sidings, still intact but disconnected from the railway line in 1967, were used for locomotive restoration work.

The Quainton Railway Society, which operates the station as the Buckinghamshire Railway Centre, restored the main station building to its 1900 appearance. A smaller building on the former Brill platform, once a shelter for passengers waiting for Brill and down trains, was used first as a store then as a shop for a number of years before its current use to house an exhibit on the history of the Brill Tramway. A former London Transport building from Wembley Park was dismantled and re-erected at Quainton Road to serve as a maintenance shed. From 1984 until 1990, the station briefly came back into passenger use, when special Saturday Christmas shopping services between Aylesbury and Bletchley were operated by Network SouthEast on Saturdays only, and stopped at Quainton Road. From August Bank Holiday 1971 until the 1987 season, and again from August Bank Holiday 2001, the station has had special passenger trains from Aylesbury in connection with events at the centre – these shuttles now run regularly each Spring and August Bank Holiday weekend.

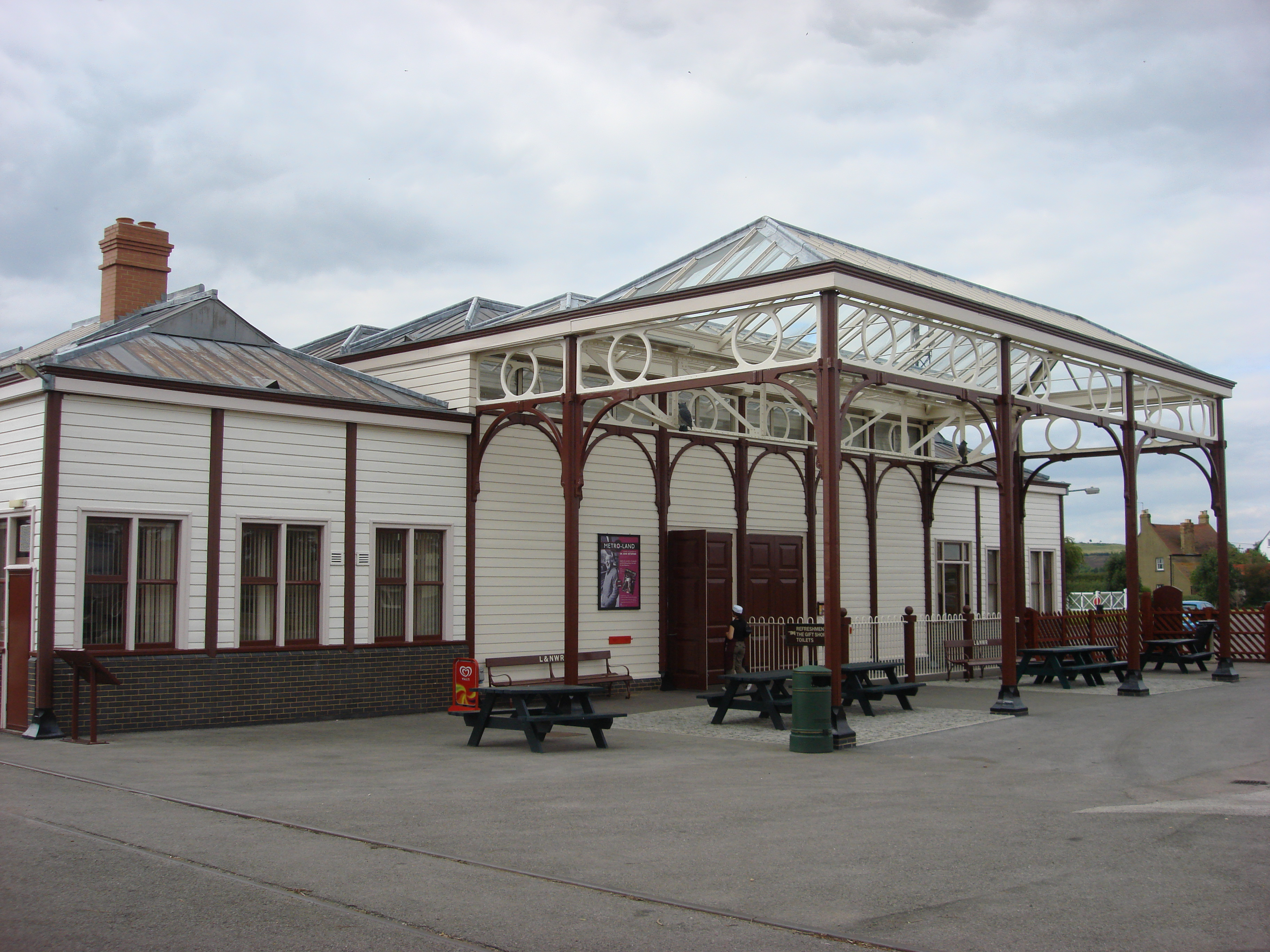
The former Oxford Rewley Road station building following its reconstruction at Quainton Road

Rewley Road, the Oxford terminus of Harry Verney's Buckinghamshire Railway and of the Oxford to Cambridge Line, closed to passengers on 1 October 1951 with trains diverted to the former GWR Oxford General, the current Oxford station. In co-operation with the Science Museum, Rewley Road was dismantled in 1999; the main station building and part of the platform canopy was moved to Quainton Road for preservation and improved visitor facilities with the main shop and office of the Buckinghamshire Railway Centre, thus maintaining it as a working building. A number of former Ministry of Supply food warehouses in what is now the extended Down Yard have been converted for various uses by the Society, including storage and exhibition of rolling stock.

Although the Buckinghamshire Railway Centre's steam trains run on the sidings which were disconnected from the network in 1967, the station still has a working railway line running to it, used for occasional special passenger trains from Aylesbury in connection with events at the centre. Regular freight trains, mainly landfill trains from waste transfer depots in Greater London to the former brick pits at Calvert, passed through until October 2021, when Network Rail closed the line to the north and lifted the tracks. In 2023, the Station Road bridge was in-filled with foamed concrete to strengthen it until its replacement is opened at which point the tracks to the north will be replaced. In 2010, the Buckinghamshire Railway Centre negotiated for a reconnection of the link between its sidings and the main line; this was to allow the centre's locomotives to run to Aylesbury, when the line is not in use by freight trains, and to rebuild part of the Brill Tramway between Quainton Road and Waddesdon Road.

== In popular culture ==
Quainton Road is regularly used as a filming location for television programmes, especially period dramas; The Jewel in the Crown, the Doctor Who serial Black Orchid and the ITV series Midsomer Murders have been filmed there. The location tasks in the 8th series of Taskmaster were also filmed around the site.

== See also ==
- Great Central Main Line
- Infrastructure of the Brill Tramway
