= Waddesdon railway station =

Former GCML and Metropolitan Railway Station in Buckinghamshire

Waddesdon
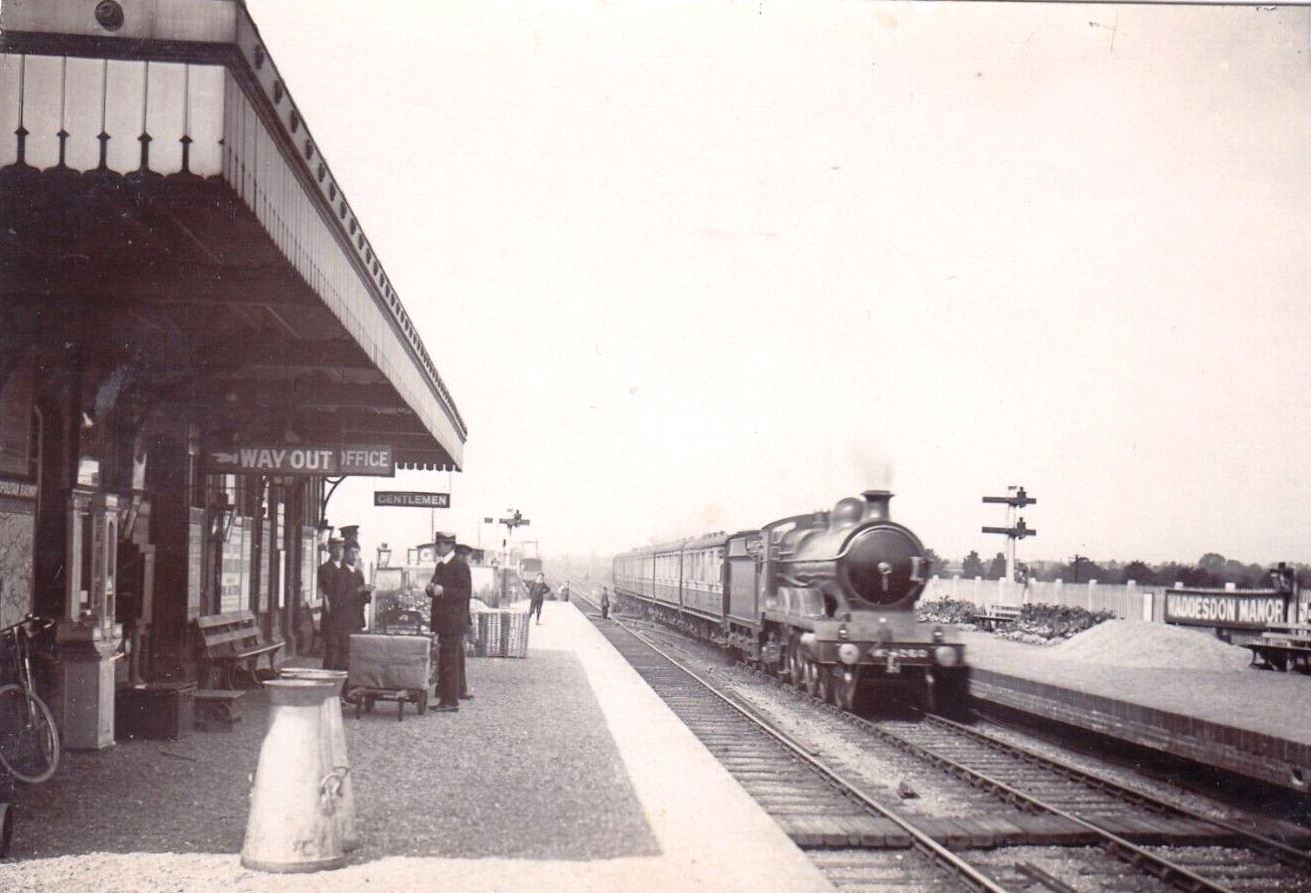
- Interactive map of Waddesdon

General information
- Location: Waddesdon
- Local authority: Buckinghamshire
- Grid reference: SP757180
- Number of platforms: 2

Railway companies
- Original company: Aylesbury and Buckingham Railway
- Pre-grouping: Metropolitan and Great Central Joint Railway
- Post-grouping: Metropolitan and Great Central Joint Railway

Key dates
- 1 January 1897: Opened as Waddesdon Manor
- 1 October 1922: Renamed Waddesdon
- 6 July 1936: Station closed

Other information
- Coordinates: 51.8554°N 0.9021°W

Waddesdon is a closed station that served the village of Waddesdon and its manor, to the north of Aylesbury in Buckinghamshire, England. The station is not to be confused with Waddesdon Road railway station at the other end of the Waddesdon Manor estate on the Brill Tramway.

== History ==
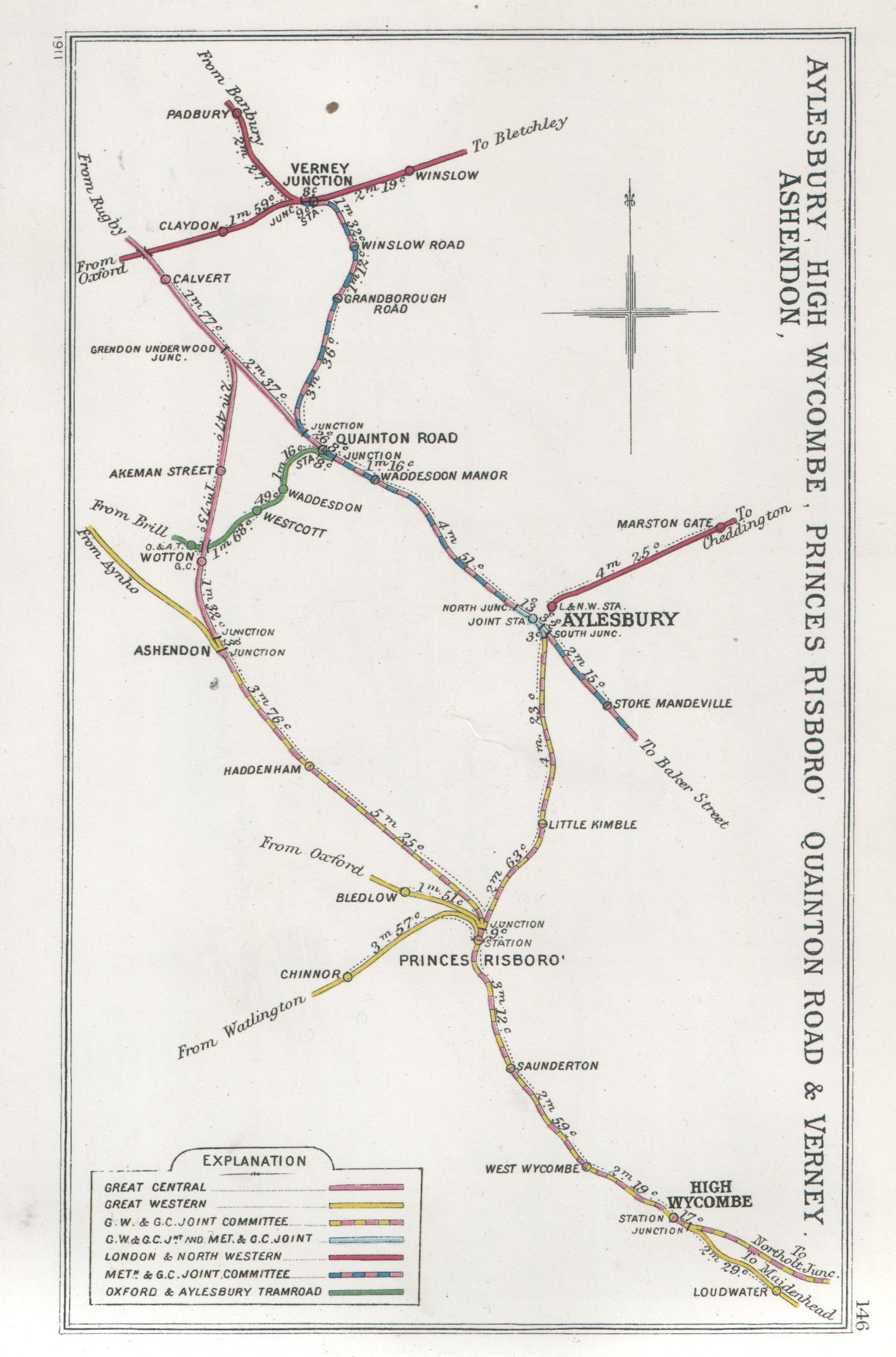
A 1911 Railway Clearing House map of railways in the vicinity of Waddesdon (shown here as Waddesdon Manor)

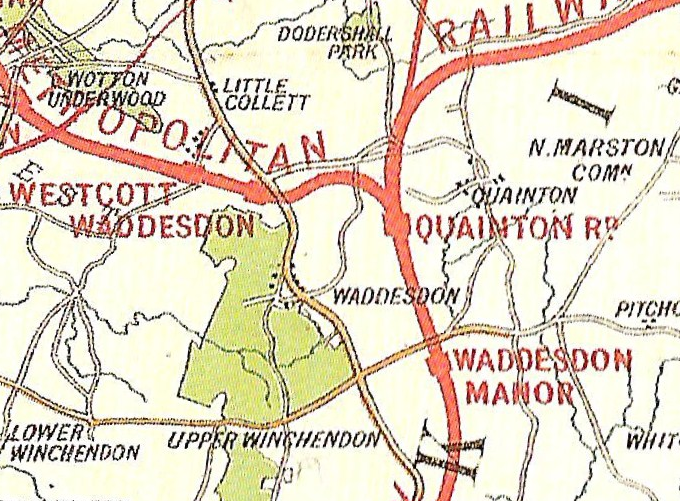
Railway stations and populated areas in the vicinity of Waddesdon, 1903. Waddesdon station is shown here as Waddesdon Manor.

The station was first opened as Waddesdon Manor by the Metropolitan Railway on 1 January 1897. "Manor" was dropped from the name on 1 October 1922. It was the first station north of Aylesbury on the section of the Metropolitan Railway between Aylesbury and Verney Junction.

The Metropolitan Railway amalgamated with several other transport companies to form the London Passenger Transport Board in 1933. The station was closed on 6 July 1936 when their services were curtailed at Aylesbury.

While open, the station was also served by former Great Central Main Line (running on the same tracks as the Metropolitan line as far as Quainton Road) which was not itself closed to passengers until 1966, under the Beeching Axe.

Today one platform of the station (on the side remote from the remaining track) remains; the other has been demolished. Until 2021 the line was used for a daily freight train carrying waste from London to Calvert, as well as special services between Aylesbury and Quainton Road for events at the Buckinghamshire Railway Centre.

Because of its association with the Metropolitan line this station is considered to be one of the Closed London Underground stations although it is 42 1/2 miles (68.4 km) from London and is not underground.

== Routes ==
Preceding station	Disused railways	Following station
Quainton Road; Line and station closed	Great Central Railway; London Extension	Aylesbury; Line closed, station open
Quainton Road; Line and station closed	Metropolitan Railway; Until 1936	Aylesbury; Line closed, station open
