= Metropolitan and Great Central Joint Railway =

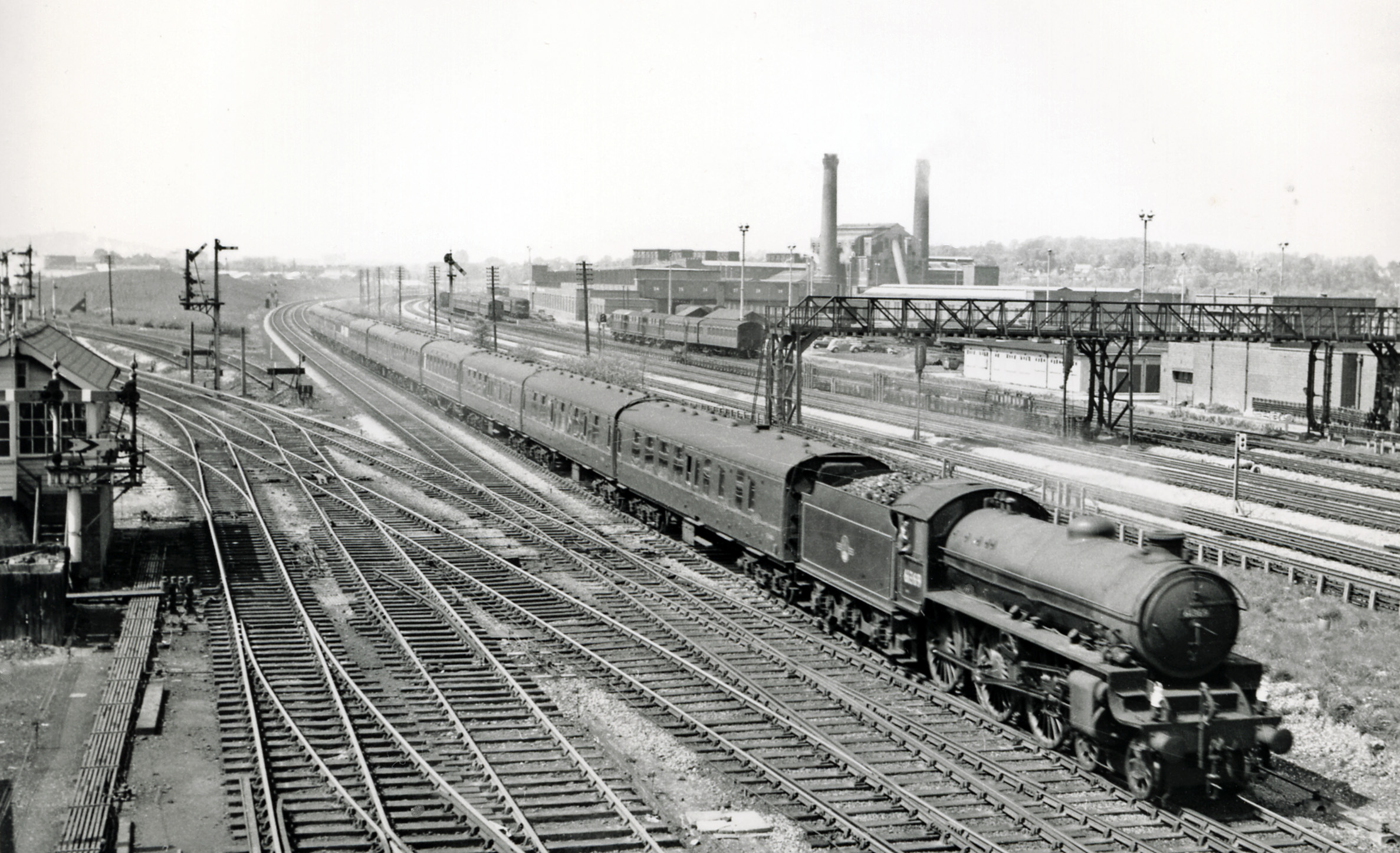
- The Manchester to Marylebone express at Neasden Junction

Overview
- Termini: Harrow on the Hill, Middlesex, England; Verney Junction, Buckinghamshire, England

History
- Opened: 2 April 1896

Technical
- Track gauge: 1,435 mm (4 ft 8 1/2 in) standard gauge

The Metropolitan and Great Central Joint Railway was a joint railway company that controlled a line extending from Harrow on the Hill in what is now north-western Greater London to Verney Junction in Buckinghamshire, England. Owned by the Metropolitan Railway and the Great Central Railway, the railway was nationalised in 1948.

== History ==
Metropolitan and Great Central Railways Act 1905
- Act of Parliament
- Parliament of the United Kingdom
- Long title: An Act for incorporating and conferring powers upon a Joint Committee of the Metropolitan and Great Central Railway Companies for leasing certain railways of the Metropolitan Company for confirming an Agreement between the two Companies in relation thereto and for other purposes.
- Citation: 5 Edw. 7. c. cxxxvi

Dates
- Royal assent: 4 August 1905

Text of statute as originally enacted

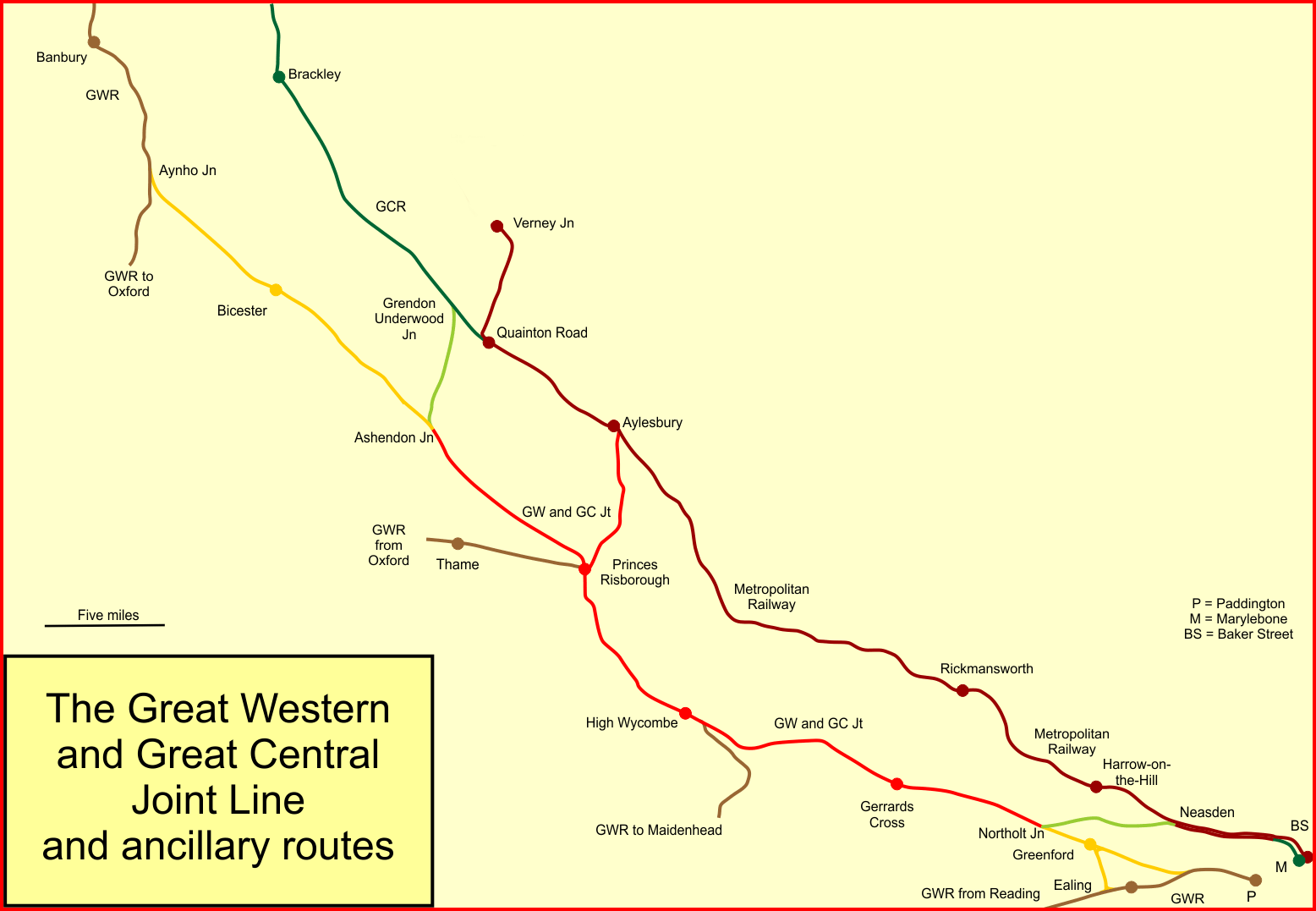
Overview of the line from Harrow-on-the-Hill and to Verney Junction, also showing the Great Western and Great Central Joint Line

On 2 April 1906, the same day that the Great Western and Great Central Joint Railway (GWGCJR) was opened, the Metropolitan and Great Central Joint Railway (MGCJR) was created. This took over the lines of the Metropolitan Railway north and west of Harrow South Junction, with the exception of the branch to Uxbridge. These comprised the main line between Harrow-on-the-Hill and Verney Junction and the branches from Chalfont & Latimer to Chesham and from Quainton Road to Brill. The MGCJR was created under the terms of the Metropolitan and Great Central Railways Act 1905 (5 Edw. 7. c. cxxxvi), which received royal assent on 4 August 1905.

Management of the joint line was to be in alternate periods of five years by the two co-owners, the first five-year term being that of the Metropolitan. After establishment of the MGCJR, new stations were opened at Sandy Lodge in 1910, and at North Harrow in 1915. Aylesbury station was leased jointly to the MGCJR and the GWGCJR from 1907.

The branch to Watford from Rickmansworth was authorised under the Metropolitan Railway Act 1912 (2 & 3 Geo. 5. c. cii) on 7 August 1912, but was a MGCJR project. Purchase of land began in 1914, but the First World War held up further progress, and the first contract for construction was not placed until December 1922.

The railways and works referred to in this section and authorised by this Act are—

- A railway (No. 2) (2 miles 1 furlong and 5.25 chains or thereabouts in length) commencing in the parish of Rickmansworth Rural in the county of Hertford by a junction with the Company's railway at a point 15 yards or thereabouts west of the centre of the bridge carrying the Company's railway over the River Gade and terminating in the parish of Watford Urban in the said county at a point in the Inclosure No. 905 on the 1/2500 Ordnance map Hertfordshire sheet XLIV. 1 (second edition 1898) 447 yards or thereabouts from the north-western corner of the Inclosure No. 959 on the said Ordnance map measured in a northerly direction and 391 yards or thereabouts from the most northern corner of the said Inclosure No. 959 measured in a north-westerly direction:
- A railway (No. 3) (6 furlongs and 4.30 chains or thereabouts in length) commencing in the parish and urban district of Rickmansworth in the county of Hertford by a junction with the Company's railway at a point 220 yards or thereabouts from the eastern end of the Company's Rickmansworth goods shed measured in an easterly direction and terminating in the parish of Rickmansworth Rural by a junction with Railway No. 2 herein-before described in the field or Inclosure No. 440 on the 1/2500 Ordnance map Hertfordshire sheet XLIII. 8 (second edition 1898) at a point 185 yards or thereabouts from the most easterly corner of the field or Inclosure No. 441 on the said map measured in a southerly direction and 230 yards or thereabouts from the most eastern corner of the field or Inclosure No. 445 on the said map measured in a westerly direction.
— Section 5, Metropolitan Railway Act 1912 (2 & 3 Geo. 5. c. cii)

At the start of 1923, the GCR was a constituent of the newly created London and North Eastern Railway; and on 1 July 1933, the Metropolitan was a constituent of the London Passenger Transport Board. Through both these changes of ownership, the MGCJR retained its title, and was listed in the Transport Act 1947, which nationalised the British railways, as one of the "bodies whose undertakings are transferred to the [British Transport] Commission".

In 1993, British Rail (now Chiltern Railways) services calling at Moor Park ceased.

== Legacy ==
The route north of Aylesbury was closed to passenger trains in September 1966. The railway line and stations are used today by Transport for London's Metropolitan line as far as Amersham, and Chiltern Railways provides a service from Marylebone as far as Aylesbury Vale Parkway station, opened on 15 December 2008, north of Aylesbury, about a four-minute journey.
