= Wood Siding railway station =

Former railway station in England

Wood Siding
- Interactive map of Wood Siding

General information
- Location: Brill, Buckinghamshire
- Local authority: Buckinghamshire
- Owner: Wotton Tramway
- Number of platforms: 1

Key dates
- 1871: Opened for freight
- 1872: Opened for passengers
- 1894: Rebuilt
- 1899: Leased (Metropolitan Railway)
- 1935: Closed (London Transport)

Other information
- Coordinates: 51.833°N 1.0244°W

Wood Siding railway station was a halt in Bernwood Forest, Buckinghamshire, England. It opened in 1871 as a terminus of a short horse-drawn tramway built to assist the transport of goods from and around the Duke of Buckingham's extensive estates in Buckinghamshire, as well as connect the Duke's estates to the Aylesbury and Buckingham Railway at Quainton Road.

In 1872, a lobbying campaign by residents of the town of Brill led to the tramway being converted for passenger use and extended a short distance beyond Wood Siding to Brill railway station, becoming known as the Brill Tramway. The railway was cheaply built, ungraded, and used poor quality locomotives; services were very slow, initially limited to a speed of 5 miles per hour (8 km/h). In the 1890s it was planned to extend the tramway to Oxford, but the scheme was abandoned. Instead, the operation of the line was taken over by the Metropolitan Railway in 1899. Between 1908 and 1910 the station was completely rebuilt on a bridge over the newly built Chiltern Main Line of the Great Western Railway, which passed directly beneath the station.

In 1933 the Metropolitan Railway was taken into public ownership and became the Metropolitan line of London Transport. As a result, Wood Siding became a station on the London Underground network, despite being over 45 miles (72 km) from the City of London. London Transport's new management aimed to move away from goods services to concentrate on passenger services. As the line served a very lightly populated rural area, the new management believed it very unlikely that it could ever be made viable. Wood Siding was closed, along with the rest of the line, from 30 November 1935. All infrastructure associated with the station was removed in 1936; the remains of the bridge which supported the station are still in place.

== Brill Tramway ==
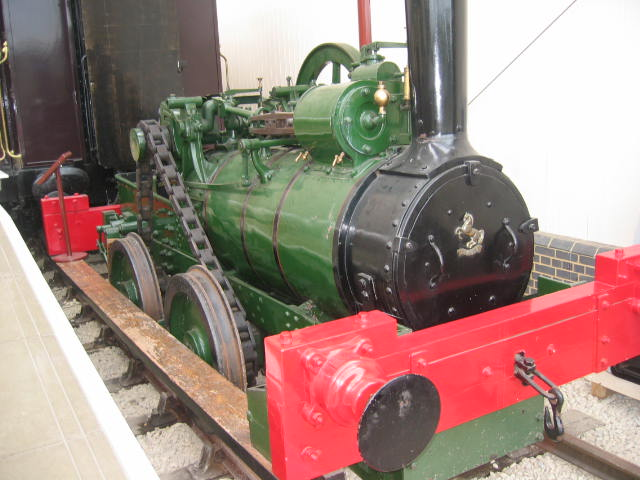
One of the original 1871 Aveling and Porter locomotives used by the line

On 23 September 1868 the small Aylesbury and Buckingham Railway (A&BR) opened, linking the Great Western Railway's station at Aylesbury to the London and North Western Railway's Oxford to Bletchley line at Verney Junction. On 1 September 1894 London's Metropolitan Railway (MR) reached Aylesbury, and shortly afterwards connected to the A&BR line, with local MR services running to Verney Junction from 1 April 1894. Through trains from the MR's London terminus at Baker Street commenced on 1 January 1897.

The Duke of Buckingham had long had an interest in railways, and had served as Chairman of the London and North Western Railway from 1852 to 1861. In the early 1870s he decided to build a light railway to carry freight from his estates in Buckinghamshire to the A&BR's line at Quainton Road. Because the proposed line ran on land owned by the Duke of Buckingham and by the Winwood Charity Trust, who consented to its construction, the line did not need Parliamentary approval and construction could begin immediately.

The first stage of the line, known as the Wotton Tramway, was a 4-mile (6.4 km) line from Quainton Road via Wotton to a coal siding at Kingswood, and opened on 1 April 1871. Intended for use by horse trams, the line was built with longitudinal sleepers to avoid horses tripping on the sleepers. In November 1871 the tramway was extended to Wood Siding, in a surviving fragment of Bernwood Forest 1 1/2 miles (2.4 km) from the town of Brill and 1,500 yards (1,400 m) from the nearest settlement at Dorton.

Lobbying from residents and businesses in Brill for the introduction of passenger services on the line led to a 1,840-yard (1,680 m) further extension from Wood Siding to Brill railway station, at the foot of Brill Hill 3/4 of a mile (1.2 km) from the hilltop town of Brill itself, in mid-1872. Two mixed trains ran each day in each direction, and the line was renamed the Brill Tramway. The Duke bought two Aveling and Porter traction engines modified to work as locomotives for the line, each with a top speed of 8 miles per hour (13 km/h), although a speed limit of 5 miles per hour (8 km/h) was enforced.

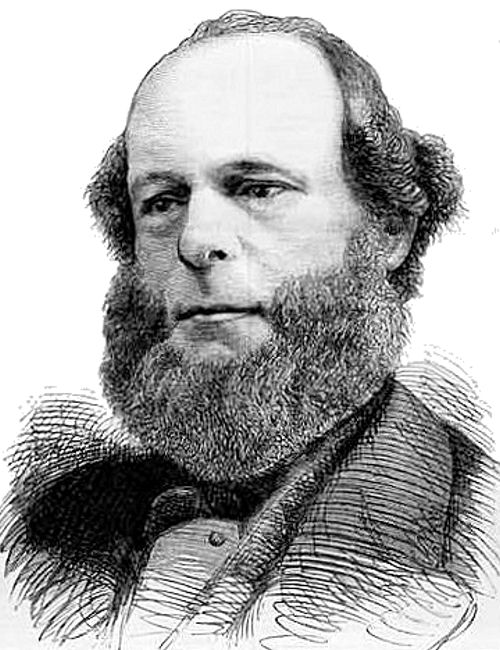
The Duke of Buckingham, founder of the Brill Tramway

The Duke died in 1889, and in 1894 the trustees of his estate set up the Oxford & Aylesbury Tramroad Company (O&ATC) with the intention of extending the line from Brill to Oxford. Rail services from London to Oxford were very poor at this time; despite being an extremely roundabout route, had the connection from Quainton Road to Oxford been built it would have been the shortest route between Oxford and the City of London. The Metropolitan Railway leased the Brill Tramway from 1 December 1899, and from then on the MR (the Metropolitan line of the London Underground from July 1933) operated all services on the line. Throughout the operation of the Brill Tramway the track and stations remained in the ownership of the Oxford & Aylesbury Tramroad Company; the MR had an option to purchase the line outright, but it was never taken up.

== Services and facilities ==
The station was positioned on the southern edge of Rushbeds Wood, a surviving part of the Bernwood Forest. It was on the western side of the level crossing over Kingswood Lane. Intended primarily for goods use, Wood Siding initially had no facilities for passengers, and the platform was simply a raised earth bank.

Despite the lack of passenger facilities, Wood Siding was the starting point for the first passenger service to operate on the line. On 26 August 1871 an excursion service ran from Wood Siding to London hauled by the Great Western Railway (GWR). It carried around 150 people, for a total of 105 1/2 passenger fares (with each child counted as half an adult), and was drawn by horses between Wood Siding and Quainton Road and by locomotive from Quainton Road to Aylesbury where the carriages were attached to the 7.30 am GWR service via Princes Risborough to London, arriving at 10.00 am. The experiment was not a success. Sharp overhanging branches along the route posed a danger to passengers and had to be cut back in the week before the excursion. The day itself was extremely rainy, and ticket sales were lower than expected. The return train from London to Quainton Road was delayed in Slough, and the excursion eventually arrived back at Wood Siding at 2.00 am.

In 1894 the crude stations on the Brill Tramway were rebuilt in anticipation of the extension to Oxford. The other stations on the line were provided with buildings containing a booking office, waiting rooms and toilets, but Wood Siding station was equipped with a small corrugated iron waiting room "with shelf and drawer" for passengers. A low passenger platform was also built. As well as the passenger platform, a short siding led to a raised wooden platform, alongside the through line to Brill, which served both as a buffer stop for the siding, and as a loading platform for milk. The station was staffed by a single porter, responsible for opening the gates of a nearby level crossing and for loading and unloading freight (mainly milk); a small, unheated hut was provided for his use. The original Aveling & Porter locomotives were slow and noisy and could be heard by the porter long before their arrival, but the more advanced locomotives introduced by the Metropolitan Railway were quieter and quicker; a ladder was installed against a large oak for the porter to watch for oncoming trains.

After the 1899 transfer of services to the Metropolitan Railway, the MR introduced a single Brown Marshall passenger carriage on the line; unlike other stations on the line, the platform height at Wood Siding was not raised at this time to accommodate the new carriage. From 1872 to 1894 the station was served by two passenger trains per day in each direction, and from 1895 to 1899 the number was increased to three per day. Following the 1899 transfer of services to the Metropolitan Railway, the station was served by four trains per day until closure in 1935.

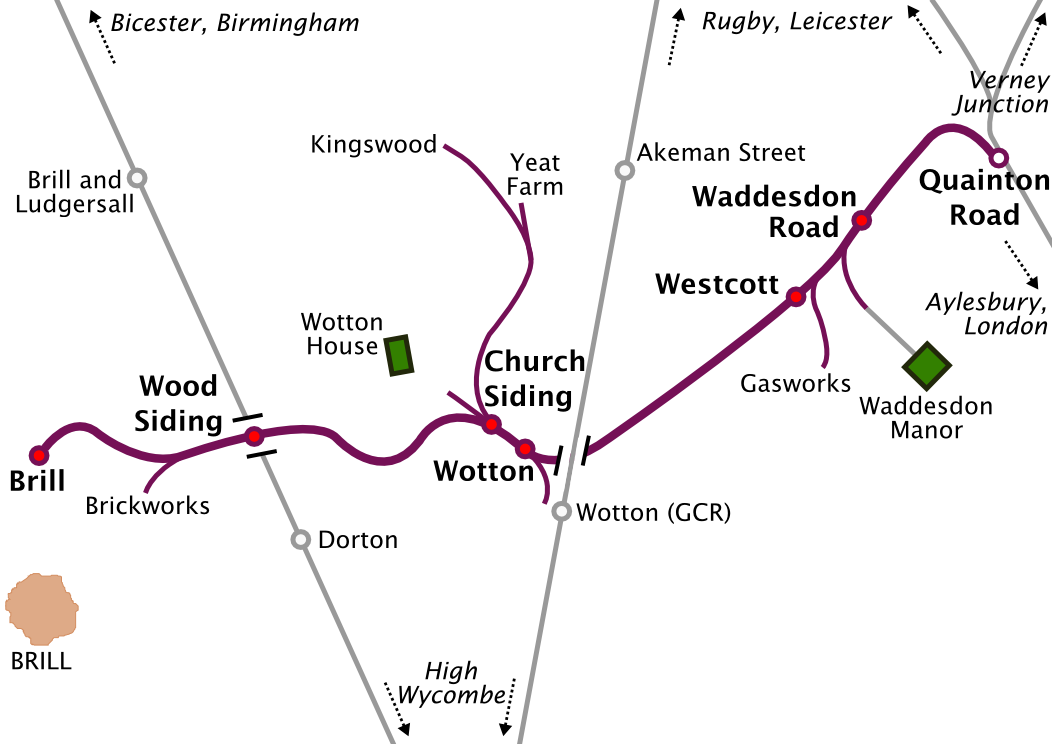
The full extent of the Brill Tramway system. The Chiltern Main Line ran directly underneath the station at Wood Siding, but did not stop there. The halt at Dorton replaced Brill and Wood Siding stations following the closure of the Brill Tramway. Not all lines and stations shown on this diagram were open contemporaneously.

Limited by poor quality locomotives and ungraded, cheaply laid track which followed the contours of the hills, and stopping at four intermediate stations between Wood Siding and Quainton Road to pick up and set down goods, passengers and livestock, trains ran very slowly. In 1887 trains took between 15 and 20 minutes to travel approximately one mile from Wood Siding to Brill, and a little over 1 hour 20 minutes from Wood Siding to the junction station with the main line at Quainton Road. Improvements to the line carried out at the time of the transfer to the Oxford & Aylesbury Tramroad, and the use of the MR's better quality rolling stock, reduced the journey time from Wood Siding to Quainton Road to about 30 minutes.

In 1910 the new Bicester cut-off line of the Great Western Railway Chiltern Main Line was routed directly through Wood Siding, but no interchange station was built. The GWR was to run in a cutting beneath the existing station; Wood Siding station and its siding were rebuilt at the GWR's expense between 1908 and 1910 to stand on a wide bridge above the GWR's line.

With trains travelling only marginally quicker than walking pace, and serving a lightly populated area, the stations at Wood Siding and Brill saw relatively little passenger use, and Wood Siding was removed from the passenger timetable by 1931; trains continued to stop on request. In 1932, the last year of private operation, Brill and Wood Siding stations saw only 3,272 passenger journeys and raised only £191 (about £11,500 in 2025) in passenger receipts.

== Withdrawal of services ==
On 1 July 1933 the Metropolitan Railway, along with London's other underground railways aside from the small Waterloo & City Railway, was taken into public ownership as part of the newly formed London Passenger Transport Board (LPTB). Thus, despite it being over 45 miles (72 km) and over two hours travel from the City of London, Wood Siding became a London Underground station. As a cost-cutting measure Wood Siding became unstaffed and the porter's hut was sold as a garden shed; from then on, the train crew would work the crossing gate. It was now officially a part of the London Underground network, but Wood Siding—in common with all Metropolitan line stations north of Aylesbury—was never shown on the tube map.

Frank Pick, Managing Director of the Underground Group from 1928 and the Chief Executive of the LPTB, aimed to move the network away from freight services and saw the lines beyond Aylesbury via Quainton Road to Brill and Verney Junction as having little future as financially viable passenger routes, concluding that over £2000 (about £120,000 in 2025) would be saved by closing the Brill Tramway. As a consequence, the LPTB decided to abandon all passenger services beyond Aylesbury. The Brill Tramway was closed on 1 December 1935, with the last trains running on 30 November. Services on the Brill Tramway were withdrawn completely following the transfer to public ownership; the LPTB considered the Verney Junction branch as having a use as a freight line and as a diversionary route, and they continued to maintain the line and operate freight services until 6 September 1947.

== Closure ==
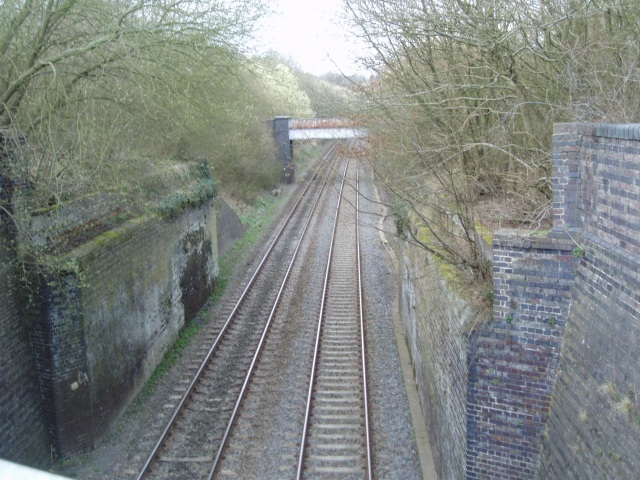
The Chiltern Main Line passes the remains of the bridge which once supported Wood Siding, 2005.

Upon the withdrawal of London Transport services, the lease expired and the railway and stations reverted to the control of the Oxford & Aylesbury Tramroad Company. With no funds and no rolling stock of its own, the O&ATC was unable to operate the line. On 2 April 1936 the entire infrastructure of the line was sold piecemeal at auction; excluding track, the buildings and structures at Wood Siding fetched a total of £9 2s 6d (about £560 in 2025). Aside from the station houses at Westcott and Brill, which were sold separately, the auction raised £112 10s (about £6,870 in 2025) in total. Wood Siding station was demolished shortly after closure; the abutments of the bridge which carried the station and sidings remain intact.

With the stations at Wood Siding and Brill closed, and the Great Western Railway's Brill and Ludgershall railway station inconveniently sited, the GWR opened a new station on the Chiltern Main Line nearby at Dorton Halt on 21 June 1937. Both Dorton Halt and Brill and Ludgersall stations were closed on 7 January 1963; the line remains in use by trains between Princes Risborough and Bicester North. There are no longer any open railway stations in the vicinity of Brill and Wood Siding.

== See also ==
- Infrastructure of the Brill Tramway

Preceding station	Disused railways	Following station
Brill; Line and station closed	Metropolitan Railway; Brill Tramway	Wotton; Line and station closed
