= Wotton railway station (Brill Tramway) =

Railway station in Buckinghamshire, England

Wotton
- Interactive map of Wotton

General information
- Location: Wotton Underwood, Buckinghamshire
- Local authority: Buckinghamshire
- Owner: Wotton Tramway
- Number of platforms: 1

Key dates
- 1871: Opened for freight
- 1872: Opened for passengers
- 1899: Leased by Metropolitan Railway
- 1935: Closed by London Transport

Other information
- Coordinates: 51.8333°N 0.9926°W

Wotton railway station was a small station in Buckinghamshire, England, built by the Duke of Buckingham in 1871. Part of a private horse-drawn tramway designed to carry freight from and around his lands in Buckinghamshire, Wotton station was intended to serve the Duke's home at Wotton House and the nearby village of Wotton Underwood. In 1872 the line was extended to the nearby village of Brill, converted to passenger use, equipped with steam locomotives, and renamed the Brill Tramway. In the 1880s, it was proposed to extend the line to Oxford, but the operation of the line was instead taken over by London's Metropolitan Railway.

Although situated in an unpopulated area, Wotton station was relatively well used. It saw the highest passenger numbers of any station on the line other than the terminus at Brill railway station and the junction with the main line to London at Quainton Road railway station, and it also carried large quantities of milk from the area's dairy farms. In 1906 the Great Western and Great Central Joint Railway (commonly known as the Alternative Route) was opened, crossing the Brill Tramway at Wotton. Although the lines were not connected, a station (also named Wotton) was built on the new line very near the existing Wotton station; the two stations shared a stationmaster.

In 1933 the Metropolitan Railway, which leased the line, was taken into public ownership and became the Metropolitan line of London Transport. Despite being a small rural station 49 miles (79 km) by train from the City of London, Wotton became a station on the London Underground. Frank Pick, the Chief Executive of the London Passenger Transport Board, aimed to abandon freight operations on the London Underground network, and saw no way in which the more distant parts of the former Metropolitan Railway could ever become viable passenger routes. As a result, all passenger services north of Aylesbury were withdrawn between 1935 and 1936; the last trains on the Brill Tramway ran on 30 November 1935. The line then reverted to the descendants of the Duke of Buckingham, but having no funds and no rolling stock they were unable to operate it. On 2 April 1936, the line's entire infrastructure, including Wotton station, was sold for scrap at auction. Except for a small building which once housed the Brill Tramway's forge, all the station buildings at Wotton have been demolished.

== Wotton Tramway ==
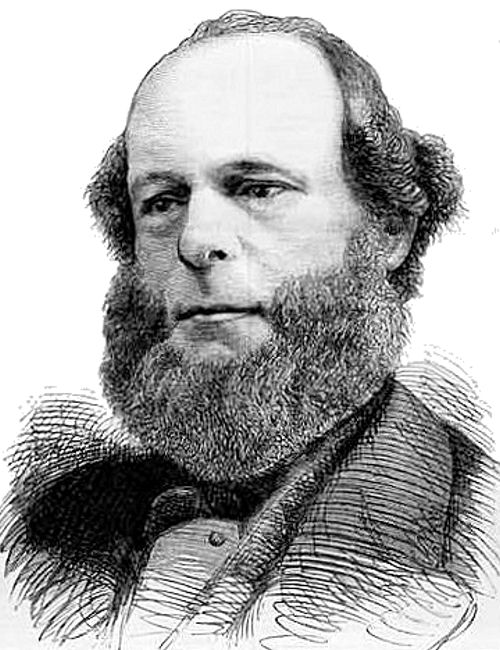
The Duke of Buckingham, founder of the Brill Tramway

On 23 September 1868, the small Aylesbury and Buckingham Railway (A&BR) opened, linking the Great Western Railway's station at Aylesbury to the London and North Western Railway's Oxford to Bletchley line at Verney Junction. On 1 September 1894, London's Metropolitan Railway (MR) reached Aylesbury, and shortly afterwards connected to the A&BR line, with local MR services running to Verney Junction from 1 April 1894. Through trains from the MR's London terminus at Baker Street began on 1 January 1897.

Richard Plantagenet Campbell Temple-Nugent-Brydges-Chandos-Grenville, 3rd Duke of Buckingham and Chandos, had long had an interest in railways, and had served as Chairman of the London and North Western Railway from 1852 until 1861. In the early 1870s, he decided to build a light railway to transport freight from his estates in Buckinghamshire to the A&BR's line at Quainton Road. As the proposed line was to run on land owned by the Duke and by the Winwood Charity Trust, who consented to its construction, the line did not need Parliamentary approval and construction could begin immediately.

The first stage of the route, known as the Wotton Tramway, was a 4-mile (6.4 km) line from Quainton Road via Wotton to a coal siding at Kingswood, opened on 1 April 1871. Intended for use by horse trams only, the line was built with longitudinal sleepers, to reduce the risk of horses tripping.

=== Extension to Brill and conversion to passenger use ===
Residents of the nearby town of Brill lobbied the Duke for the introduction of passenger services on the line. This led to an upgrading and extension of the line from Wotton, via the original terminus of the tramway system at Wood Siding, to a new terminus at the foot of Brill Hill, north of the hilltop town of Brill itself. The new Brill railway station opened in March 1872. In addition to freight trains which ran as and when required, two mixed trains per day ran in each direction. The Duke bought two Aveling and Porter traction engines modified to work as locomotives, each with a top speed of 8 miles per hour (13 km/h), although a speed limit of 5 miles per hour (8 km/h) was enforced. With the extension to Brill opened, the line began to be referred to as the Brill Tramway.

In 1889 the Duke of Buckingham died, and in 1894 the trustees of his estate set up the Oxford & Aylesbury Tramroad Company (O&ATC) with the intention of extending the line from Brill to Oxford, but the extension beyond Brill was never built. Rail services from London to Oxford were very poor at this time; despite being an extremely roundabout route, had the connection from Quainton Road to Oxford been built it would have been the shortest route between Oxford and the City of London.

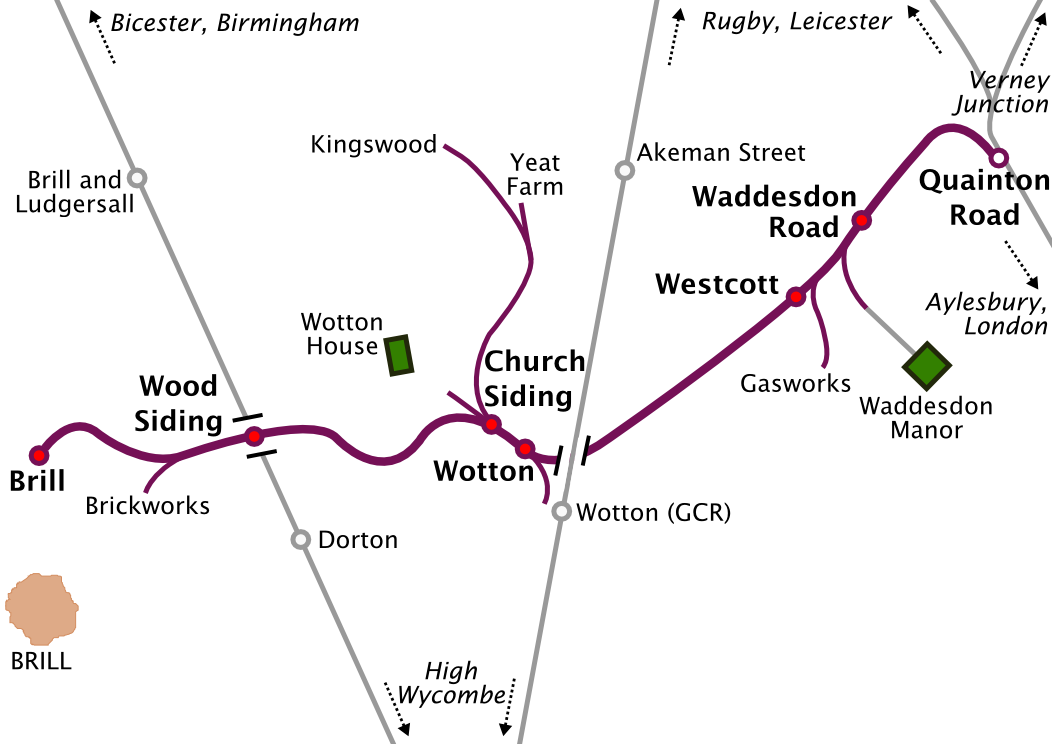
The full extent of the Brill Tramway system. The Alternative Route crosses, but does not join, the Brill Tramway at Wotton. Not all lines and stations shown on this diagram were open contemporaneously.

The Metropolitan Railway leased the Brill Tramway from 1 December 1899, and from then on the MR (the Metropolitan line of the London Underground from July 1933) operated all services on the line, although the line continued to be owned by the O&ATC. Throughout the operation of the Brill Tramway the track and stations remained in the ownership of the Oxford & Aylesbury Tramroad Company; the MR had an option to purchase the line outright, but it was never taken up.

== Structures and sidings ==
Wotton station was situated in open countryside, about one mile (1.6 km) from the nearest settlement of Wotton Underwood, which in 1871 had a population of around 220. Roughly halfway between the line's terminus at Brill and the junction with the main line at Quainton Road, the station marked the official midpoint of the line for operating purposes. When more than one locomotive was in operation on the line, the Tramway operated a token signalling system using colour-coded staffs; drivers on the section between Quainton Road and Wotton were obliged to carry a blue staff; those between Wotton and Brill (and the Kingswood siding) a red staff. The station was situated on a sharp curve; had the extension to Oxford been built, the station would have needed to have been resited to accommodate longer and faster trains.

The original station was a crude earth bank 6 inches (150 mm) high, held in place by wooden planks, but it was later rebuilt. The station was equipped with a short level platform, and a small 25-foot (7.6 m) square goods shed. The main users of the goods facilities appear to have been the local dairy farms; in the 1880s, prior to the transfer to Metropolitan Railway operation, Wotton station was handling from 45,000 to 60,000 gallons (200,000 to 270,000 L; 54,000 to 72,000 US gal) of milk each year. The passenger station building itself was a wooden hut with an iron roof, 24 feet (7.3 m) long by 10 feet 9 inches (3.28 m) wide, including a waiting room, a booking office and male and female toilet facilities. Until the early 20th century the station porter was required to keep a three-gallon kettle on the boil for foot warmers, should the passengers require them. A pair of small cottages were built near the station to house Tramway employees.

A small siding immediately west of the station originally led to a stable, which housed the Tramway's horses. After the line's mechanisation in 1872 the stables were closed, and the siding served a small cattle pen.

=== Church Siding ===
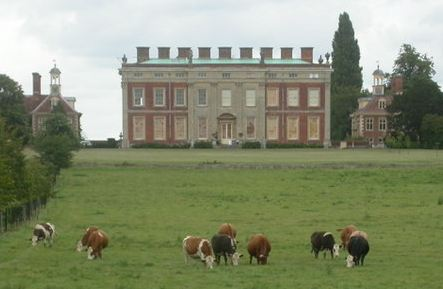
The Church Siding spur, west of Wotton station, served the Duke of Buckingham's home at Wotton House.

Slightly to the west of the station was a junction with a 1 mile 57 chain (1 mile 1,300 yards; 1.8 km) spur line known as Church Siding, which ran through Wotton Underwood to the hamlet of Kingswood. This spur line served two coal merchants, and never officially carried passengers; it was never upgraded to carry locomotives and remained worked by horses throughout its existence. (The siting of the coal bay at Kingswood was controversial, as it was inconveniently sited and built on low ground prone to flooding. The Duke and the line's surveyor had disagreed on the best location for the depot; to resolve the matter the Duke had thrown his hat in the air and the coal bay was built where the hat landed.) The spur to Kingswood was abandoned in about 1915, although a short stub, running between the Brill Tramway and the Duke of Buckingham's home at Wotton House, remained open for occasional goods traffic until the line was closed.

=== Great Western and Great Central Joint Railway ===
On 2 April 1906, the Great Western and Great Central Joint Railway, commonly known as the Alternative Route, opened to passengers. The new line linked Ashendon Junction on the Chiltern Main Line to the Great Central Railway at Grendon Underwood, a short distance northwest of Quainton Road. The Alternative Route crossed the Brill Tramway on a bridge at Wotton, and another station, also named "Wotton", was built on the embankment immediately to the south of the existing Wotton station. Although the lines did not connect, a temporary siding was built from the Brill Tramway onto the new embankment, and used for the transport of construction materials and the removal of spoil from the works during the building of the new line. The two Wotton stations were very close together, and the same stationmaster was responsible for both stations.

== Passenger services ==
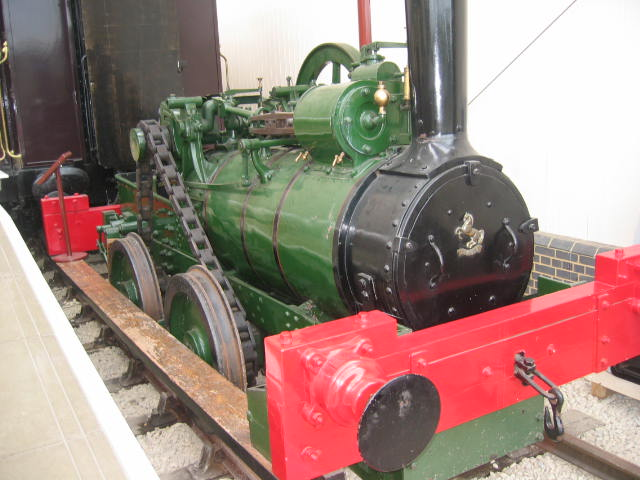
One of the original 1871 Aveling and Porter locomotives used on the Brill Tramway before operations were taken over by the Metropolitan Railway

From 1872 to 1894 the station was served by two passenger trains per day in each direction, and from 1895 to 1899 the number was increased to three per day. Following the 1899 transfer of services to the Metropolitan Railway, the station was served by four trains per day until closure in 1935. Limited by poor quality locomotives and ungraded, cheaply laid track which followed the contours of the hills, and stopping at three intermediate stations between Wood Siding and Quainton Road to pick up and set down goods, passengers and livestock, trains ran very slowly; in 1887 trains took between 35 and 45 minutes to travel from Wotton to Brill, and around an hour from Wotton to the junction station with the main line at Quainton Road.

Improvements to the line carried out at the time of the transfer to the Oxford & Aylesbury Tramroad, and the use of the MR's better quality rolling stock, reduced the journey time from Wotton to Brill and Quainton Road to around 10 minutes and 25 minutes respectively. Serving a lightly populated area, Wotton railway station saw little passenger use, although it was the most-used station on the line other than Brill itself and the junction station at Quainton Road; in 1932, the last year of private operation, the station saw 2,648 passenger journeys earning a total of £144 (about £8,700 in 2025) in passenger receipts.

== Withdrawal of services ==
On 1 July 1933 the Metropolitan Railway, along with London's other underground railways aside from the short Waterloo & City Railway, was taken into public ownership as part of the newly formed London Passenger Transport Board (LPTB). Thus, despite it being 45 miles (72 km) and over two hours travel from the City of London, Wotton formally became a London Underground station, although in common with other Metropolitan line stations north of Aylesbury it was never shown on the tube map. Frank Pick, Managing Director of the Underground Group from 1928 and the Chief Executive of the LPTB, aimed to move the network away from freight services and saw the lines beyond Aylesbury via Quainton Road to Brill and Verney Junction as having little future as financially viable passenger routes, concluding that over £2,000 (about £120,000 in 2025) would be saved by closing the Brill Tramway.

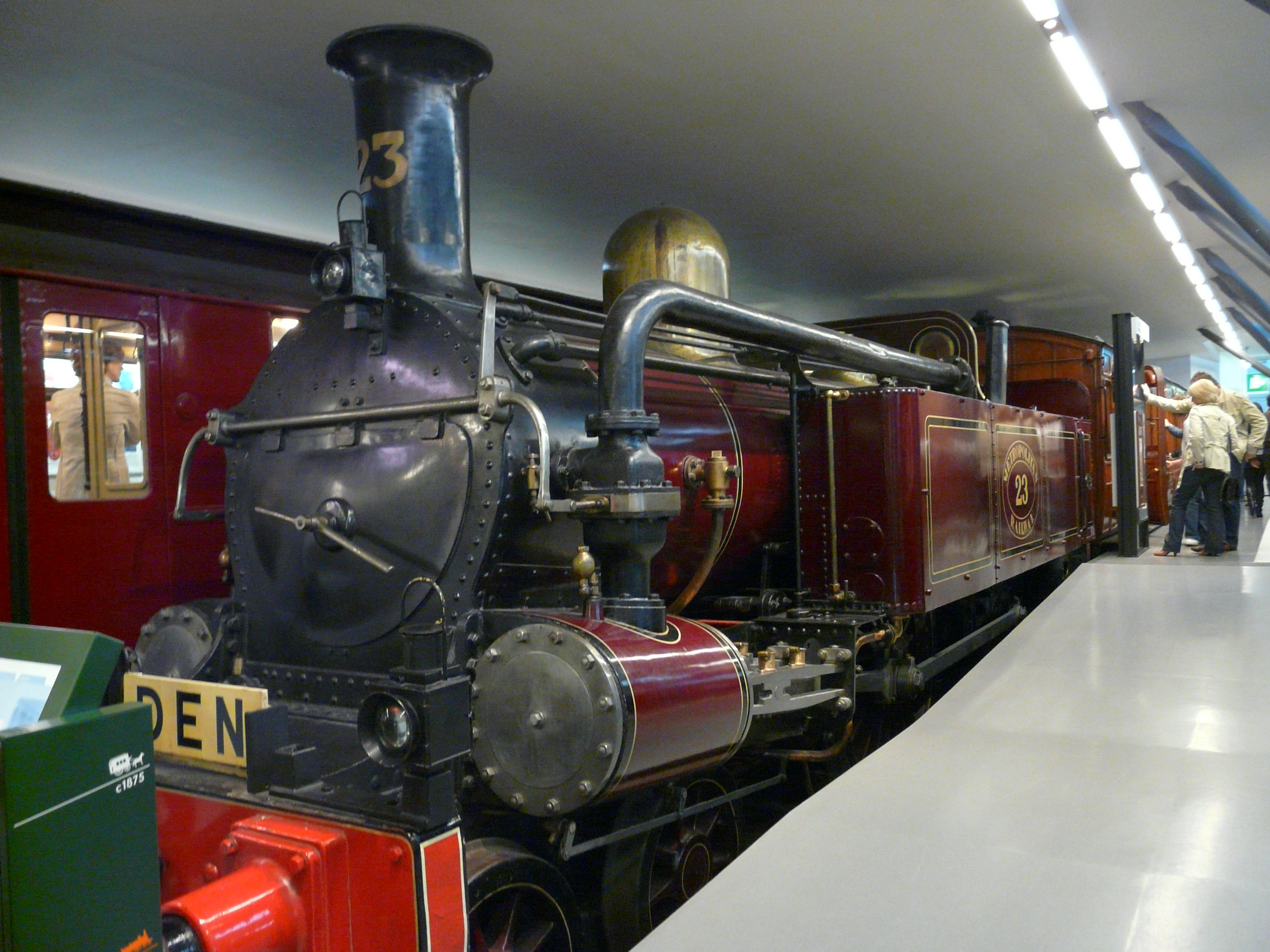
One of the two Metropolitan Railway A Class locomotives used on the Brill Tramway at the time of its closure

With Pick wanting to abandon freight services and seeing no future for the extremities of the former Metropolitan Railway as passenger routes, the LPTB decided to abandon all passenger services beyond Aylesbury. All services on the Brill Tramway were officially withdrawn on 1 December 1935, with the last trains running on 30 November. While services were withdrawn completely from the Brill Tramway, the LPTB considered the Verney Junction branch as having a use as a freight line and as a diversionary route, and continued to maintain the line and to operate freight services until 6 September 1947.

== Closure ==
Following the withdrawal of London Transport services the Metropolitan Railway's lease was voided and the railway and stations reverted to the control of the Oxford & Aylesbury Tramroad Company. With no funds and no rolling stock of its own the O&ATC was unable to operate the line, and on 2 April 1936 the entire infrastructure of the line was sold at auction. Wotton station building sold for £5 10s (about £340 in 2025), the platform for £2 5s (about £140 in 2025), and the cattle pen for 11s (about £30 in 2025).

Wotton station on the Alternative Route, which had passed from the ownership of the Great Central Railway to the London and North Eastern Railway, remained open (albeit little used and served by only two trains per day in each direction) until 7 December 1953, when the line was abandoned. All buildings of the Brill Tramway station at Wotton were subsequently demolished, other than a small building which had once housed the Tramway's forge, which was left derelict. The bridge that had formerly carried the Alternative Route was demolished in 1970, and the former Great Central Railway station on the Alternative Route was converted to a private house.

== See also ==
- Infrastructure of the Brill Tramway

== Bibliography ==
- Connor, J. E. (2000). Abandoned Stations on London's Underground. Colchester: Connor & Butler. ISBN 0-947699-30-9. OCLC 59577006.
- Demuth, Tim (2003). The Spread of London's Underground. Harrow Weald: Capital Transport. ISBN 1-85414-266-6.
- Edwards, Dennis; Pigram, Ron (1988). The Romance of Metro-Land. London: Godfrey Cave Associates Ltd. ISBN 978-1-870630-37-5.
- Foxell, Clive (2010). The Metropolitan Line: London's first underground railway. Stroud: The History Press. ISBN 978-0-7524-5396-5. OCLC 501397186.
- Horne, Mike (2003). The Metropolitan Line: An illustrated history. Harrow Weald: Capital Transport. ISBN 1-85414-275-5.
- Jackson, Alan (2006). London's Metro-Land. Harrow: Capital History. ISBN 1-85414-300-X. OCLC 144595813.
- Jones, Ken (1974). The Wotton Tramway (Brill Branch). Locomotion Papers. Blandford: The Oakwood Press. ISBN 0-85361-149-1.
- Melton, Ian (1984). R. J., Greenaway (ed.). "From Quainton to Brill: A history of the Wotton Tramway". Underground (13). Hemel Hempstead: The London Underground Railway Society. ISSN 0306-8609.
- Mitchell, Vic; Smith, Keith (2006). Aylesbury to Rugby. Midhurst: Middleton Press. ISBN 1-904474-91-8.
- Oppitz, Leslie (2000). Lost Railways of the Chilterns. Newbury: Countryside Books. ISBN 1-85306-643-5. OCLC 45682620.
- Simpson, Bill (1985). The Brill Tramway. Poole: Oxford Publishing. ISBN 0-86093-218-4.
- Simpson, Bill (2005). A History of the Metropolitan Railway. Vol. 3. Witney: Lamplight Publications. ISBN 1-899246-13-4.

Preceding station	Disused railways	Following station
Wood Siding; Line and station closed	Metropolitan Railway; Brill Tramway	Westcott; Line and station closed
