= Metropolitan railway =

Metropolitan railway may refer to:

- Metropolitan line, part of the London Underground
- Metropolitan Railway, a former underground railway in London
- Metropolitan District Railway, a former underground railway in London
- Metropolitan Street Railway, a former streetcar network in New York City
- Metropolitan Street Railway (Toronto), a radial railway that ran from Toronto to Newmarket and to Sutton

== See also ==
- Rapid transit
- Metropolitan line (disambiguation)
