= Metropolitan line (disambiguation) =

The Metropolitan line is a London Underground line.

Metropolitan line may also refer to:

- Metropolitan line (Toronto), a former interurban railway in Toronto
- Metropolitan line (1933–1988), a former line on the Metropolitan Railway, London
