= Brill railway station =

Former railway terminus in Buckinghamshire, England

Brill
- Brill station at the time of closure
- Interactive map of Brill

General information
- Location: Brill, Buckinghamshire
- Local authority: Buckinghamshire
- Owner: Wotton Tramway
- Number of platforms: 1

Key dates
- 1872: Opened
- 1894: Rebuilt
- 1899: Leased by Metropolitan Railway
- 1935: Closed by London Transport

Other information
- Coordinates: 51.8323°N 1.0482°W

Brill railway station was the terminus of a small railway line in Buckinghamshire, England, known as the Brill Tramway. Built and owned by the 3rd Duke of Buckingham, it was later operated by London's Metropolitan Railway, and in 1933 briefly became one of the two north-western termini of the London Underground, despite being 45 miles (72 km) and over two hours' travelling time from the City of London.

Approximately 3/4 of a mile (1.2 of a km) north of Brill, the station was opened in March 1872 as the result of lobbying from local residents and businesses. As the line was cheaply built and ungraded and the locomotives were of poor quality, services were very slow, initially taking 1 hour 45 minutes to traverse the six miles (9.7 km) from Brill to the junction station with main line services at Quainton Road. Although serving a lightly populated area and little-used by passengers, the station was a significant point for freight traffic, particularly as a carrier of milk from the dairy farms of Buckinghamshire to Aylesbury and London. A brickworks was also attached to the station, but it proved unable to compete with nearby rivals and closed within a few years of opening.

During the 1890s, plans were made to extend the tramway to Oxford, but the scheme was abandoned. Instead, the operation of the line was taken over by the Metropolitan Railway in 1899, and the line became one of the railway's two north-western termini. It was upgraded and better-quality locomotives were introduced making the journey time three times faster.

In 1933 the Metropolitan Railway came under public control and became the Metropolitan line of London Transport. The management of London Transport aimed to reduce goods services, and it was felt that there was little chance of the more distant parts of the former Metropolitan Railway ever becoming viable passenger routes. The line was closed on 30 November 1935, and all buildings and infrastructure at Brill associated with the line were sold at auction. Most of the infrastructure was subsequently demolished, though three station cottages survive.

== Wotton Tramway ==
On 23 September 1868 the small Aylesbury and Buckingham Railway (A&BR) opened, linking the Great Western Railway's station at Aylesbury to the London and North Western Railway's Oxford to Bletchley line at Verney Junction. On 1 September 1894, London's Metropolitan Railway (MR) reached Aylesbury, and shortly afterwards connected to the A&BR line, with local MR services running to Verney Junction from 1 April 1894. Through trains from the MR's London terminus at Baker Street began on 1 January 1897.

Richard Temple-Nugent-Brydges-Chandos-Grenville, 3rd Duke of Buckingham and Chandos, had long had an interest in railways, and had served as chairman of the London and North Western Railway from 1852 until 1861. In the early 1870s he decided to build a light railway to transport freight from his estates in Buckinghamshire to the A&BR's line at Quainton Road. (Note: Because the proposed line ran on land owned by the Duke of Buckingham and by the Winwood Charity Trust, who consented to its construction, the line did not need Parliamentary approval and construction could begin immediately.) The first stage of the route, known as the Wotton Tramway, was a 4-mile (6.4 km) line from Quainton Road via Wotton to a coal siding at Kingswood, and opened on 1 April 1871. Intended for use by horse trams, the line was built with longitudinal sleepers, to avoid horses tripping.

=== Extension to Brill ===
The Metropolitan Railway following the MR takeover of services on the Brill Tramway. Brill (arrowed) is one of two northwestern termini. The image is skewed approximately 45° from north; the main MR line in reality ran almost directly northwest from its junction with the present day Circle line in London, shown at the bottom of the map. The blue bar marks the northern limit of London Underground operations after 1936, and the black bar the limit of LU operations after 1961.

Lobbying from the nearby town of Brill for the introduction of passenger services on the line led to an extension from Wotton to a new terminus at the foot of Brill Hill, north of the hilltop town of Brill itself, in March 1872. Two mixed trains each day ran in each direction. With the extension to Brill opened the line was renamed the Brill Tramway. The Duke bought two Aveling and Porter locomotives built to a modified traction engine design, each with a top speed of 8 miles per hour (13 km/h), although a speed limit of 5 miles per hour (8 km/h) was enforced.

The Duke died in 1889. In 1894, the trustees of his estate set up the Oxford & Aylesbury Tramroad Company (O&ATC) with the intention of extending the line from Brill to Oxford, but the extension beyond Brill was never built. (Note: Rail services from London to Oxford were very poor at this time; despite being an extremely roundabout route, had the connection from Quainton Road to Oxford been built it would have been the shortest route between Oxford and the City of London.) The MR leased the Brill Tramway from 1 December 1899, although the line continued to be owned by the O&ATC. (Note: Although from 1899 services were operated by the Metropolitan Railway (the Metropolitan line of the London Underground from July 1933), the track and stations remained in the ownership of the Oxford & Aylesbury Tramroad Company, controlled by the Trustees of the late Earl Temple's Estate. The MR had an option to purchase the line outright, but it was never taken up.)

== Services and facilities ==
Brill was a small town of 1,400 people when the line opened, and owing to the town's hilltop setting the station was 3/4 of a mile (1.2 of a km) from Brill itself. Brill railway station was small, with a single low platform. At its opening there was one station building, which served as the freight depot, passenger terminal, and ticket office. Next to it was a siding that led to a cattle pen. Two cottages for station staff were built near the station in 1871. A third cottage across the road from the station was built in 1885, possibly to serve as an office. After the 1899 transfer of services to the Metropolitan Railway, the MR introduced a single Brown Marshalls passenger carriage on the line; at this time, a small wooden hut was added to the station to serve as a ticket office and waiting room and a short section of platform was raised to conventional height to allow access to the higher doors on the new carriage.

=== Passenger services ===
From 1872 to 1894 the station was served by two passenger trains per day, and from 1895 to 1899 the number was increased to three per day. Following the 1899 transfer of services to the Metropolitan Railway, the station was served by four trains per day until its closure in 1935. Limited by poor-quality locomotives and ungraded, cheaply laid track which followed the contours of the hills, and with five intermediate stops to pick up and set down goods, passengers and livestock, trains ran very slowly; in 1887 trains needed 1 hour 45 minutes to travel the six miles from Brill to the junction station at Quainton Road. Improvements to the line carried out at the time of the transfer to the Oxford & Aylesbury Tramroad, and the use of the MR's better-quality rolling stock, reduced the journey time from Brill to Quainton Road to between 32 and 36 minutes.

Serving a lightly populated area, and with trains travelling only marginally quicker than walking pace, Brill station saw relatively little use by passengers; in 1932, the last year of private operation, Brill station (and the nearby halt at Wood Siding) saw only 3,272 passenger journeys and raised only £191 (about £11,500 in 2025) in passenger receipts.

=== Goods facilities ===
Although little-used by passengers, Brill station was valuable as a relatively rapid link between the dairy farms of Buckinghamshire and the markets of Aylesbury and London; around 30 carts per day would deliver milk to Brill station for the first train each morning. There was also a small amount of coal traffic to the station; Brill coal dealer George Green received three coal wagons per month. In addition, a storehouse at the station held beer supplied by the breweries of Brackley and Aylesbury. Bricks and tiles from the brick and tile factories of Brill were used in the construction of Waddesdon Manor, near the eastern end of the Brill Tramway, between 1874 and 1889.

In 1885 the Duke of Buckingham opened a modern brickworks near Brill station, with a dedicated siding, and in 1895 his heir William Temple-Gore-Langton, 4th Earl Temple of Stowe, expanded the brickworks, which became the Brill Brick & Tile Works, using the Brill Tramway to deliver bricks to the main line at Quainton Road. With the connection to Oxford and the upgrading of the rail line abandoned, Brill Brick & Tile Works was unable to compete with the nearby brickworks at Calvert, and soon closed. (Note: In 1899 the Great Central Railway main line from London to Manchester was built, running directly past the brickworks at Calvert. As a consequence it was far cheaper and faster for the industries of Lancashire and London to buy bricks from Calvert instead of Brill, despite the towns being less than seven miles (11km) apart.) The building was taken over by the Fenemore workshop, making hay loaders, before being converted into a timber yard in the 1920s.

== Closure ==
On 1 July 1933 the Metropolitan Railway, along with London's other underground railways except for the small Waterloo & City Railway, was taken into public ownership as part of the newly formed London Passenger Transport Board (LPTB). Thus, despite it being 45 miles (72 km) and over two hours' travel from the City of London, Brill station became a terminus of the London Underground network. (Note: Despite being a part of the London Underground network, Brill—in common with all Metropolitan line stations north of Aylesbury—was never shown on the tube map, though they did appear on maps issued by the Metropolitan Railway.) Frank Pick, managing director of the Underground Group from 1928 and the Chief Executive of the LPTB, aimed to move the network away from freight services, and saw the lines beyond Aylesbury via Quainton Road to Brill and Verney Junction as having little future as financially viable passenger routes, concluding that over £2,000 (about £120,000 in 2025) would be saved by closing the Brill Tramway. As a consequence, the LPTB decided to withdraw all passenger services beyond Aylesbury. (Note: Although the Brill Tramway was closed completely following transfer to public ownership, the LPTB considered that the Verney Junction branch still had a use as a freight line and as a diversionary route, and continued to maintain the line and to operate freight services until 6 September 1947.) The Brill Tramway was closed on 1 December 1935; the last services ran on 30 November.

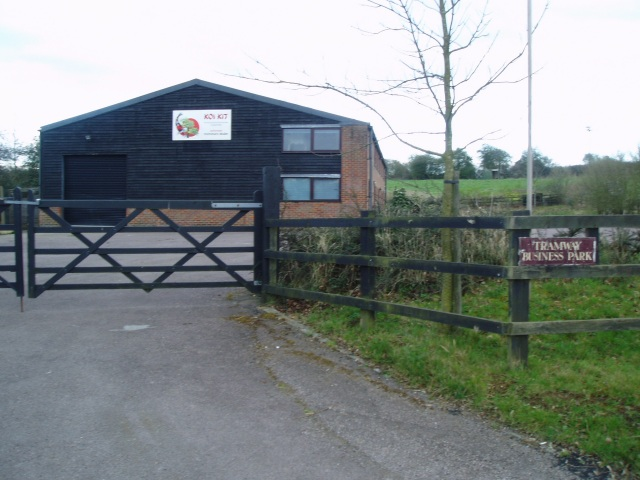
Tramway Business Park, on the site of the Duke of Buckingham's brickworks, close to the site of Brill station

Upon the withdrawal of London Transport services the lease expired, and the railway and stations reverted to the Oxford & Aylesbury Tramroad Company. With no funds and no rolling stock of its own, the O&ATC was unable to operate the line, and on 2 April 1936 the entire infrastructure of the line was sold at auction. The former goods shed at Brill sold for £7 10s (about £1,070 in 2025), (Note: Excluding the station houses at Westcott and Brill, which were sold separately, the auction raised £112 10s (about £6,870 in 2025).) and a railway-owned house attached to Brill station fetched £350 (about £21,400 in 2025). All buildings in Brill associated with the railway station have been demolished, with the exception of the station cottages, one of which is now called "Sleepers". The station site is now largely open fields, and the site of the brickworks is a light industrial park known as the "Tramway Business Park".

== See also ==
- Infrastructure of the Brill Tramway

== Notes and references ==
=== Bibliography ===
- Connor, J. E. (2000). Abandoned Stations on London's Underground. Colchester: Connor & Butler. ISBN 0-947699-30-9. OCLC 59577006.
- Demuth, Tim (2003). The Spread of London's Underground. Harrow Weald: Capital Transport. ISBN 1-85414-266-6.
- Foxell, Clive (2010). The Metropolitan Line: London's first underground railway. Stroud: The History Press. ISBN 978-0-7524-5396-5. OCLC 501397186.
- Horne, Mike (2003). The Metropolitan Line: An illustrated history. Harrow Weald: Capital Transport. ISBN 1-85414-275-5.
- Jackson, Alan (2006). London's Metro-Land. Harrow: Capital History. ISBN 1-85414-300-X. OCLC 144595813.
- Melton, Ian (1984). R. J., Greenaway (ed.). "From Quainton to Brill: A history of the Wotton Tramway". Underground (13). Hemel Hempstead: The London Underground Railway Society. ISSN 0306-8609.
- Mitchell, Vic; Smith, Keith (2006). Aylesbury to Rugby. Midhurst: Middleton Press. ISBN 1-904474-91-8.
- Oppitz, Leslie (2000). Lost Railways of the Chilterns. Newbury: Countryside Books. ISBN 1-85306-643-5. OCLC 45682620.
- Simpson, Bill (2005). A History of the Metropolitan Railway. Vol. 3. Witney: Lamplight Publications. ISBN 1-899246-13-4.

Preceding station	Disused railways	Following station
Terminus	Metropolitan Railway; Brill Tramway	Wood Siding; Line and station closed
