= Christian Barman =

British architect and designer (1898–1980)

- Barman in 1941
- Born: Christian Augustus Gustav; 13 September 1898; Antwerp, Belgium
- Died: 1980 (aged 81–82)
- Occupation: Industrial designer

Christian Augustus Barman OBE RDI (né Gustav; 13 September 1898 – 1980) was a British industrial designer and administrator.

== Personal life ==
Barman was born in Antwerp, Belgium on 13 September 1898, the son of Thomas Gustav, who was a Norwegian sailor. Christian Gustav later changed his surname to Barman, from Barmen, the small island off the coast of Norway where his father was raised.

== Career ==
From 1916, Barman studied architecture at the University of Liverpool. He then ran his own architectural and design practice until 1935, when Frank Pick offered him the role of publicity officer at London Transport.

In 1931, he became a naturalised British citizen.

In 1934, he designed a chrome-plated metal electric fan heater that was manufactured by the Gramophone Company, and copies are now in the permanent collections of MoMA in New York City and the V&A in London.

In 1948, he was appointed a Royal Designer for Industry. From 1949 to 1950, he was president of the Society of Industrial Artists, now the Chartered Society of Designers.

In the 1963 New Year Honours, Barman was awarded an OBE, "For services as Executive Member, Design Panel, British Transport Commission."

He was the author of several non-fiction works including a biography of Frank Pick, The Man Who Built London Transport, and a novel Ramping Cat (1941).

== Legacy ==
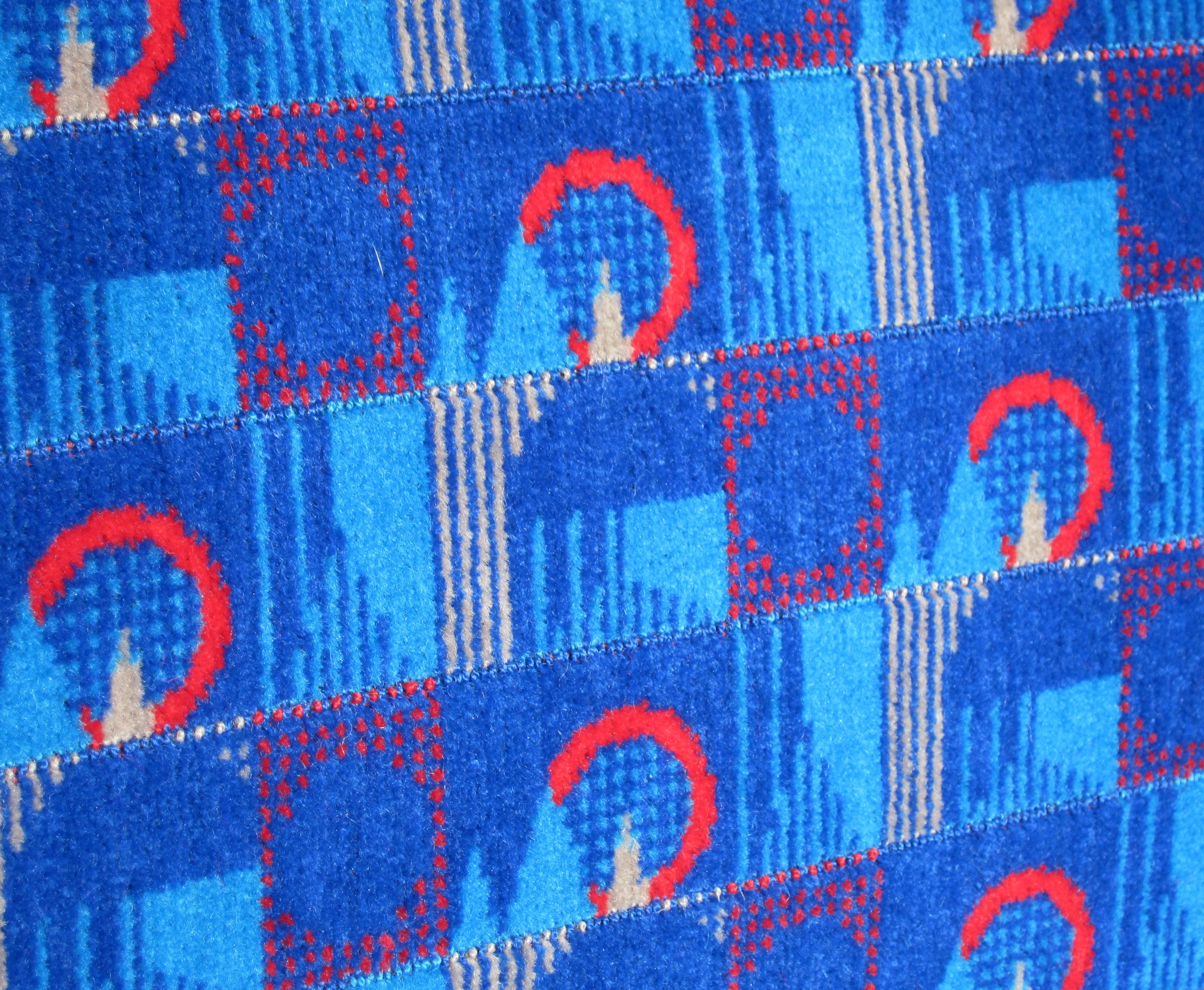
A Transport for London seat covering moquette in the 2011 Barman design, named after Barman, who in 1936 commissioned the first moquettes for the London Underground

In 2010, TfL commissioned the Barman moquette, designed by WallaceSewell (Emma Sewell and Harriet Wallace-Jones) and manufactured by Camira Fabrics. It was first used in 2011, on refurbished Central Line trains, and is now used on several deep level tube lines. The design incorporates the London Eye, the St Paul's dome, the Elizabeth Tower (Big Ben) and the two towers of Tower Bridge.
