= Moquette =

Woven pile fabric with cut or uncut pile

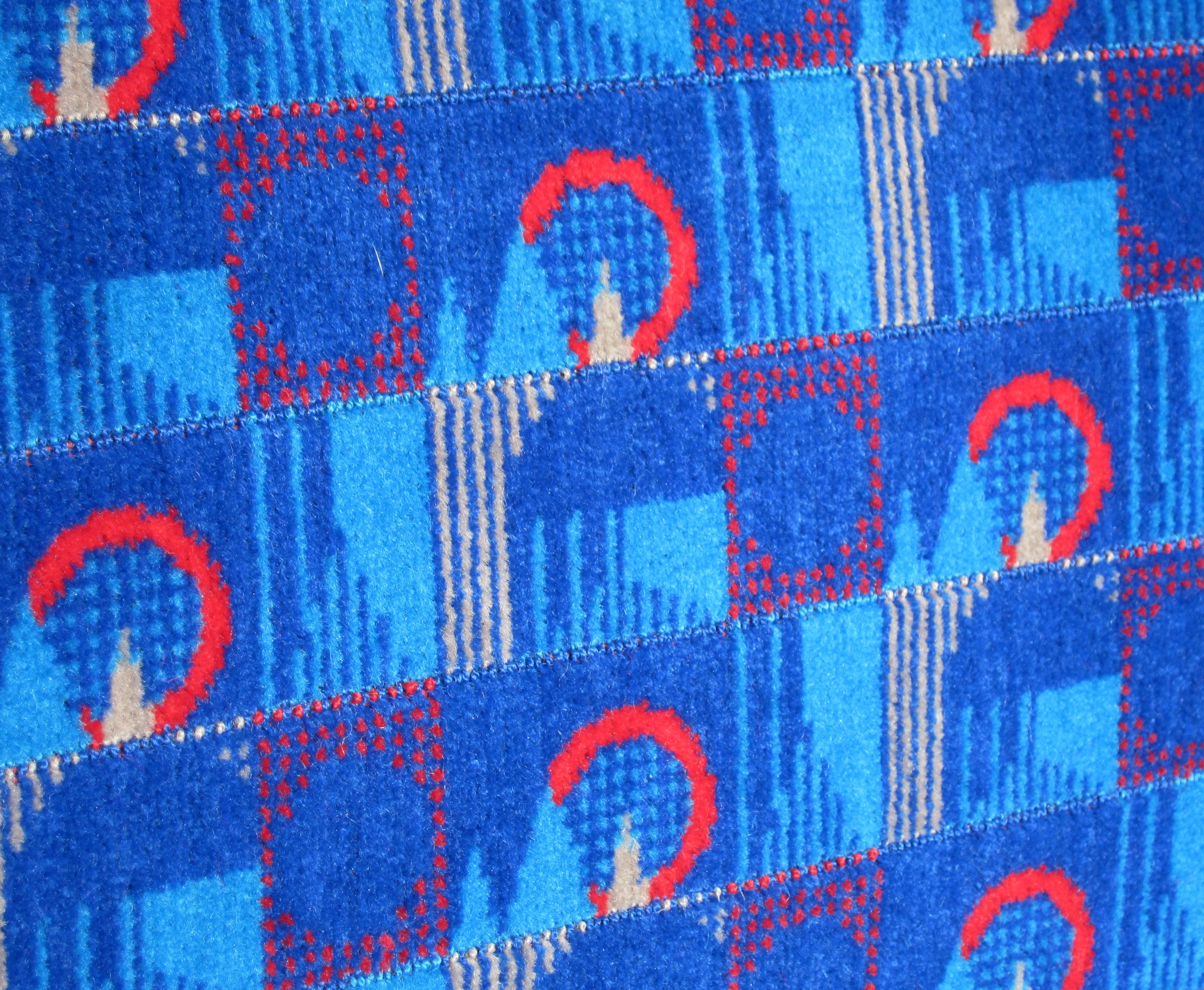
A Transport for London moquette seat covering in the 2011 Barman design, named after Christian Barman, who commissioned the first moquettes for the London Underground in 1936.

Moquette is a type of woven pile fabric in which cut or uncut threads form a short dense cut or loop pile. The pile's upright fibres form a flexible, durable, non-rigid surface with a distinctive velvet-like feel. Traditional moquette weave fabrics are made today from a wool nylon face with an interwoven cotton backing, and are ideally suited to applications such as public transport.

== Origin ==
Moquette originated in France, where it was woven by hand. Named after the French word for carpet, its standard width was a Flemish ell of 27 inches. There were two finishes: moquette velouté, which had a cut pile like English Wilton carpet, and moquette bouclé, which had an uncut pile like Brussels carpet. It is still woven in Yorkshire using traditional techniques.

== Uses ==
=== Carpeting ===
As of 1946, a moquette carpet was on display in the banquet room of Mount Vernon, allegedly a gift from Louis XVI to George Washington. It depicted the American coat of arms in the center and had a green background with gold stars on it. It is 210 inches (530 cm) by 186 inches (470 cm) and constructed of wool, linen, and cotton. As of February 2023, it was listed as not on display at Mount Vernon under the ownership of the Mount Vernon Ladies' Association.

=== Clothing ===
Moquette is occasionally used in clothing. In 1932–33, the United States Army Air Corps B-2 leather flight jackets were lined with moquette which was not as bulky as sheepskin.

=== Public transport upholstery ===
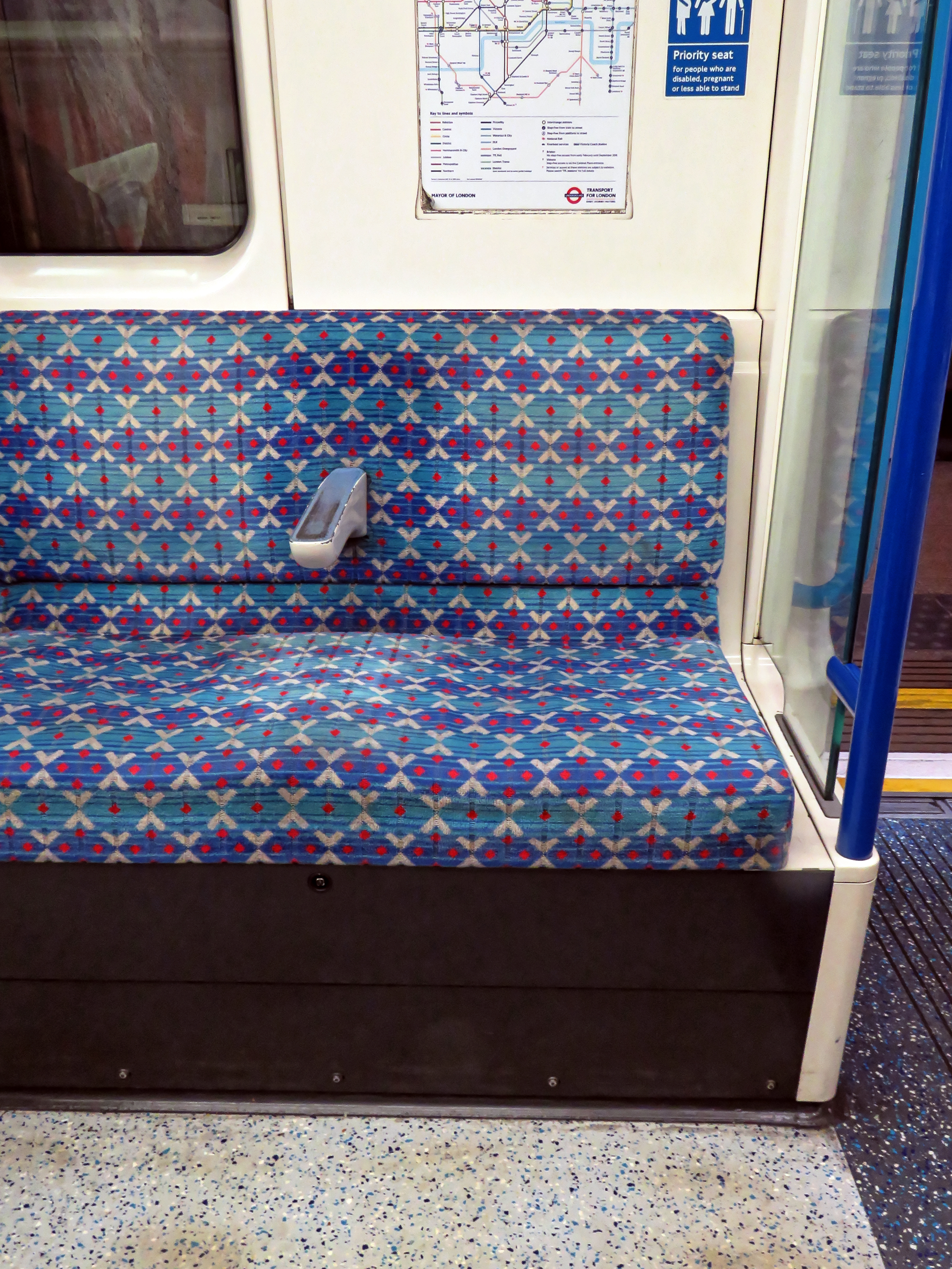
Moquette seat coverings on the Victoria Line of the London Underground

Due to its durability, moquette is used as public transit seat coverings in many countries. During the decades of the many railway companies, there were some ten moquette manufacturers in the UK; by mid-1960s this was reduced to Courtaulds and Holdsworth Fabrics. Because it was relatively cheap to produce and readily available, the fabric began to be used in London in the 1920s, starting with a brown pattern from Firth Furnishings called Lozenge. It is still used a century later, particularly to upholster the seats of London Underground's Tube trains. Such seat covers may be designed with intricate bright colored patterns to conceal wear. These may reflect local culture and history, such as "Barman" or "Landmark" designed in 2010 for London public transportation seat coverings that depict local landmarks.

A contestant on the quiz show Mastermind, Emily Medhurst, chose "Transport for London moquette" as her specialist subject. One question was which war artist created two moquette designs called Alperton and Arnot – the answer was Paul Nash. She impressed viewers both with her detailed knowledge and with her pullover, which she had knitted with the design used by the Overground.

== See also ==
- Mockado
