= Metropolitan line (1933–1988) =

London's Metropolitan Railway (MR) amalgamated with other underground railways, tramway companies and bus operators on 1 July 1933, to form the London Passenger Transport Board (LPTB); the MR became the Board's Metropolitan line.

The LPTB cut back services to Aylesbury, closing the Brill and Verney Junction branches, and invested in new rolling stock and improving the railway between Baker Street and Harrow-on-the-Hill, including the extension of the Bakerloo line which took over the Stanmore branch. The outbreak of the Second World War saw these works suspended, and it was not until 1948 that Harrow-on-the-Hill station was enlarged to six platforms.

Steam locomotives were used north of Rickmansworth until the early 1960s, when they were replaced following the electrification of the tracks to Amersham and the introduction of new electric multiple units. London Transport withdrew its service north of Amersham at this time.

In 1988, the route from Hammersmith to Aldgate and Barking was re-designated as the Hammersmith & City line, and the route from New Cross and New Cross Gate to Shoreditch as the East London line; this left the Metropolitan line as the route from Aldgate to Baker Street and northwards to stations via Harrow, and that designation continues to this day.

== History ==
=== Metropolitan Railway (1863–1933) ===
The origins of the Metropolitan line lie with the Metropolitan Railway (MR), the first underground railway built in London. The MR opened a line between Paddington and Farringdon Street in 1863. The line, opened with steam locomotives and gas-lit wooden carriages, was built to connect the capital's mainline railway termini. After forming part of the 'inner circle' (today's Circle line), the railway began to extend out to the suburbs from Baker Street, reaching Harrow in 1880, and eventually as far as Verney Junction, over 50 miles (80 kilometres) from Baker Street and the centre of London. The railway started to electrify its routes from 1905. It used electric multiple units on the electrified routes in London, but in order to serve stations on the unelectrified outer lines, coaches were hauled out of London by an electric locomotive that was changed for a steam locomotive en route. After the First World War, the "Metro-land" name was used to promote the new housing estates being built near the railway.

=== New Works, war and aftermath (1933–48) ===
On 1 July 1933, the MR amalgamated with other underground railways, tramway companies and bus operators to form the London Passenger Transport Board (LPTB). As a result, the MR became the Metropolitan line of London Transport. The LPTB was not interested in running goods and freight services. Carriage of parcels was discontinued on 2 July 1934; Vine Street goods station (near Farringdon station) closed on 30 June 1936, and the London and North Eastern Railway (LNER) took over all freight traffic from 1 November 1937. At the same time the LNER became responsible for hauling passenger trains with steam locomotives north of Rickmansworth.

The lines north of Aylesbury to Verney Junction and Brill were closed; the last train to Brill ran on 30 November 1935, and that to Quainton Road and Verney Junction on 2 April 1936. Quainton Road continued to be served by the LNER.

From 1935, the New Works Programme entailed some station rebuilding at places such as Rayners Lane, Eastcote, Ruislip Manor and Uxbridge. However, there was a bottleneck at Finchley Road where four tracks became two for the run through the tunnels to Baker Street. The solution chosen by the LPTB was to extend the Bakerloo line through new tube tunnels from Baker Street to Finchley Road, and for these trains to take over the service to intermediate stations to Wembley Park and the branch to Stanmore. The old Metropolitan & St. John's Wood Railway stations at St John's Wood Road, Marlborough Road and Swiss Cottage were replaced by new tube stations at St John's Wood and Swiss Cottage. Platform alterations were needed between Wembley Park and Finchley Road, and a flying junction was built at Wembley Park junction. The intention was to enlarge Harrow from four to six platforms, providing dedicated platforms for LNER trains, but this was not completed before the outbreak of the Second World War caused work to be suspended. Construction began in April 1936, and on 2 November 1939 the Bakerloo line served Stanmore for the first time.

The District line was congested east of Whitechapel on the line to Barking, so some Metropolitan trains were extended to Barking from 1936. Initially these were 6-car Hammersmith & City line trains that had been seconded from the East London line, but from 1939, 8-car Uxbridge line trains were extended from Aldgate. However, this caused operational problems, and Barking was again served by Hammersmith & City line trains from 1941. Through trains to the East London line via the St Mary's Curve were withdrawn in November 1939.

The isolated Great Northern & City Railway between Moorgate and Finsbury Park became the Northern City line, part of the Edgware–Morden line (designated as the Northern line from 1937). The original trains were replaced by Northern line tube trains on 15 May 1939. The Northern Heights plan would have seen the line extended to Alexandra Palace, but works were suspended after the outbreak of the Second World War.

First class travel was abolished on local and Uxbridge services in 1940, and on all Metropolitan trains from October 1941. The Metropolitan served Quainton Road again from May 1943 to May 1948.

=== Nationalisation (1948–88) ===
London Transport (LT) was nationalised, along with the railway companies, on 1 January 1948. Immediately after the war, money for investment in the railway was short; housebuilding was given priority, and the main line railways took precedence in the new organisation.

However, the Bakerloo line extension before the war had rearranged the tracks south of Wembley Park so that the slow Bakerloo lines ran between the fast Metropolitan lines. North of Preston Road junction, the tracks were arranged with fast and slow lines paired together; this meant that southbound fast trains had to cross both slow lines on the flat. Removing this junction was seen as a high priority, and station rebuilding and signalling changes meant that from May 1948, the slow lines ran between the fast lines all the way to Harrow. The work begun at Harrow before the war was over was completed, and involved opening two more platforms so as to give British Railways (BR) trains their own.

North of Wembley Park, there was a bottleneck where the six platforms shared four tracks for half a mile before Stanmore junction. Two additional lines were built in 1954, segregating Metropolitan and Bakerloo trains.

Approval for modernisation of the Metropolitan main line was given in 1956. This meant quadrupling the line from Harrow to the junction with the Watford branch, electrifying the line from Rickmansworth to Amersham and ordering new electric multiple units. A Stock trains began running in 1960; the Chesham branch operated with electric traction from September 1960. The last locomotive-hauled train ran on 9 September 1961. The LT service was cut back to Amersham, with the stations beyond being serviced by BR diesel multiple units. The quadrupling was completed in June 1962. The new all-electric timetable saw 27 peak-hour trains arriving at Baker Street: 12 from Uxbridge, six from Amersham, one from Chesham and eight from Watford.

The Great Central Main Line from Marylebone to Sheffield was considered by Dr Beeching as an unnecessary duplication of other lines that served the same places, especially the Midland Main Line and to a lesser extent the West Coast Main Line. Express passenger services from London to Sheffield and Manchester were discontinued in January 1960, leaving only three "semi-fast" London-to-Nottingham trains per day. The line north of Aylesbury finally closed on 4 March 1963.

In 1988, the route from Hammersmith to Aldgate and Barking became designated as the Hammersmith & City line, and the route from New Cross and New Cross Gate to Shoreditch as the East London line; this left the Metropolitan line as the route from Aldgate to Baker Street and northwards to stations via Harrow.

== Rolling stock ==
=== Electric locomotives ===
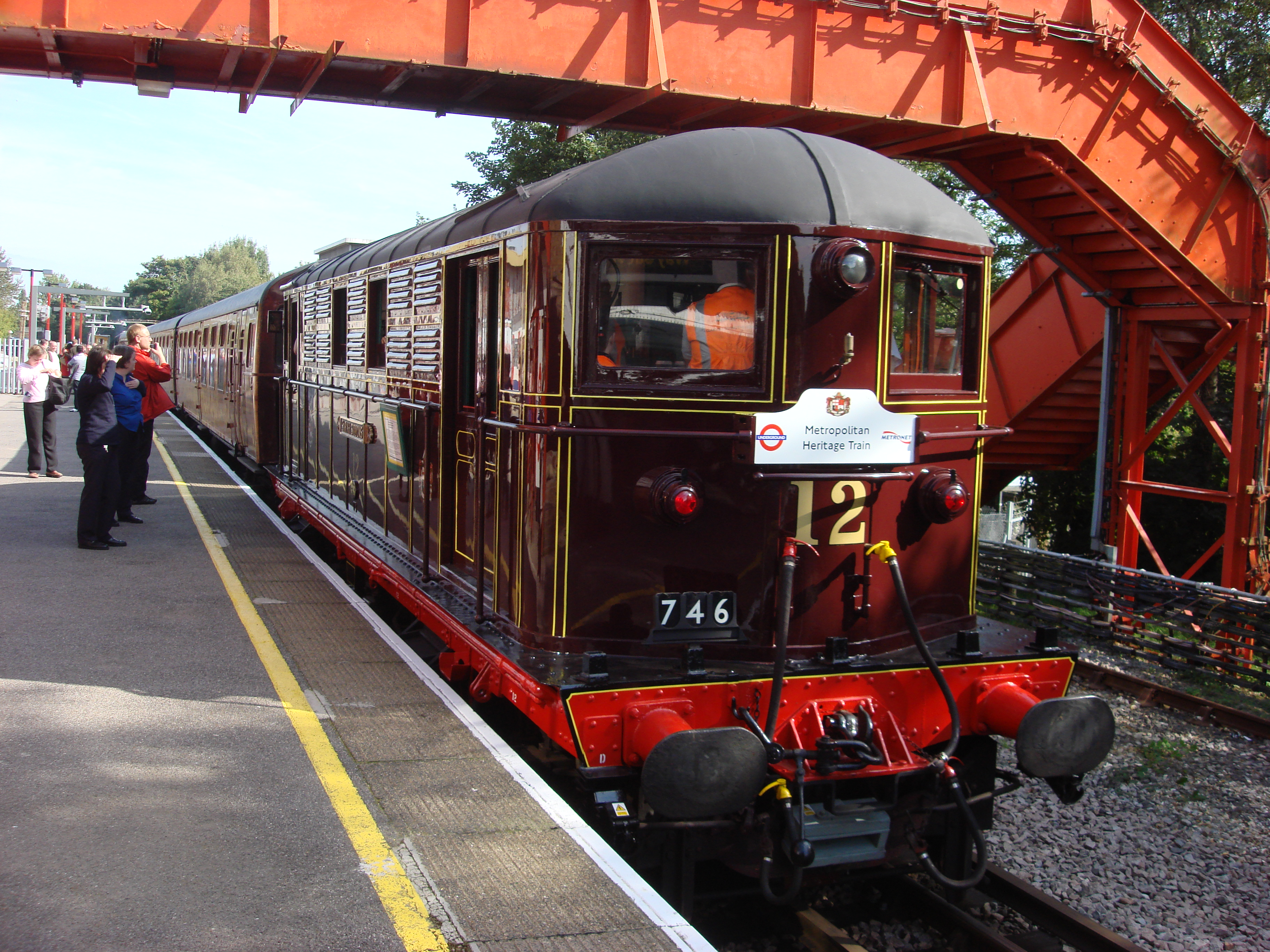
Electric Locomotive No.12 "Sarah Siddons" seen at a heritage event at Amersham in 2008

London Transport (LT) took responsibility for the twenty 1,200 hp (890 kW) electric locomotives used for hauling coaches on the electrified lines south of Rickmansworth. They continued in this service until working ended on passenger trains after the introduction of the A Stock multiple units in 1961.

One locomotive is preserved as a static display at the London Transport Museum, and another, No. 12 "Sarah Siddons", has been used for heritage events, most recently in 2011.

=== Steam locomotives ===
LT also took over the MR's steam locomotives; however, on 1 November 1937 the later G, H and K Class steam locomotives were transferred to the LNER, which took over all freight workings and became responsible for hauling passenger trains with steam locomotives north of Rickmansworth. From the early 1940s these were replaced by ex-Great Central Railway locomotives, now classified LNER Class A5. These were replaced by LNER L1s after 1948; ten years later in 1958, when the joint line was transferred to British Railways' London Midland Region, former London, Midland and Scottish Railway (LMS) locomotives replaced the L1s. Steam working ended on passenger trains after the introduction of the A Stock in 1961.

LT kept eleven locomotives for use in departmental work. From 1956 these were replaced by ex-GWR 0-6-0PT pannier tanks, to be replaced by diesel-hydraulic locomotives DL81 to DL83 in 1971.

Two Metropolitan Railway locomotives survive, one A Class No. 23 (LT L45) at the London Transport Museum, and E Class No. 1 (LT L44) is preserved at the Buckinghamshire Railway Centre.

=== Coaching stock ===
LT inherited Dreadnought coaches and two Pullman coaches, used on the locomotive-hauled trains that travelled north of Rickmansworth. The Pullman coaches were withdrawn early in the Second World War; however, the Dreadnoughts continued until replaced by the A stock in 1961. The Vintage Carriages Trust has three preserved Dreadnought carriages.

The unelectrified Chesham branch was converted to autotrain working in 1940, in which the trains could be driven from each end, thus avoiding the time-consuming repositioning of the locomotive. LNER C13 Class locomotives were used for this push-pull working, along with two three-car sets of Ashbury bogie stock from the multiple units that had become surplus after the introduction of O stock. The Bluebell Railway has four of the 1898–1900 Ashbury and Cravens carriages, and a fifth, built at Neasden, is at the London Transport Museum.

=== Multiple units ===
London Transport inherited a number of different incompatible electric multiple units from the Metropolitan Railway. Between 1927 and 1933, multiple-unit compartment stock had been built in batches by Metropolitan Carriage and Wagon and by Birmingham Carriage and Wagon, to be used on electric services from Baker Street and the City to Watford and Rickmansworth. These were of three incompatible types, with different electrical equipment and engines. In order to make a uniform fleet, units were fitted with Westinghouse brakes and cars with different engines were regeared to allow these to work in multiple with other cars. In 1938, 9 x 8-coach and 10 x 6-coach MW units were redesignated London Underground T Stock. The Buckinghamshire Railway Centre is home to two T Stock carriages.

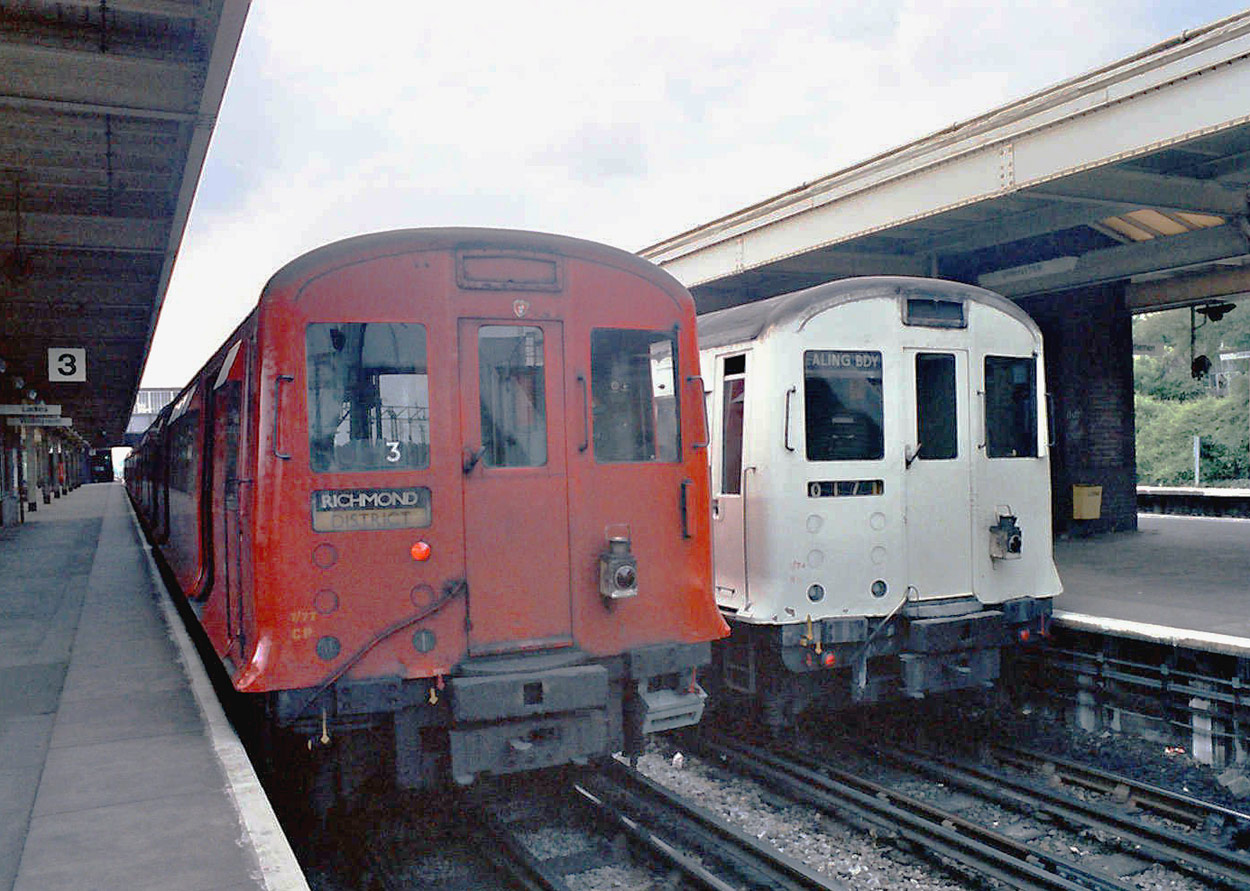
P Stock in red at Upminster

The joint Met&GW stock on the Hammersmith & City line, dating from 1905, was replaced by O stock that initially operated in 4- and 6-car formations, entering service from 1937. These trains were entirely made of motor cars, and this caused a problem with the electrical supply, so trailer cars were added from 1938.

P Stock was ordered to replace all the remaining Metropolitan multiple units. A combination of 3-car units and 2-car units, to run in 6- and 8-car lengths, was delivered from July 1939. Two trailers were included in an 8-car formation, but these were designed to allow conversion to motor cars at a later date after improvements to the power supply.

However, O and P stock were not compatible, having different electrical equipment. After 1955, trains were converted to PCM control and relabelled CO and CP stock as appropriate.

F Stock trains had been built for the District Railway in the early 1920s. In the 1950s, a number became available for use on the Metropolitan line; they mainly worked the semi-fast Harrow and Uxbridge services, and ran on the East London line as modified 4-car sets.

When the Amersham electrification project commenced in 1959, London Transport placed an order with Cravens of Sheffield for 248 cars of A60 stock to replace the T stock and locomotive-hauled trains. A further twenty-seven trains of A62 stock were built in 1962–63 to replace the F and P stock trains on the Uxbridge service. These were arranged as 4-car units which could operate as 4- or 8-car trains. Four-car units operated on the East London line from 1977, and a 4-car unit operated the Chesham shuttle.

In 1968, an order was placed for 35 six-car trains to replace the CP and CO stock on the Hammersmith & City and Circle lines. These were arranged as two units with a driving cab in the motor car at one end only, and were normally run as three pairs. These trains were designated C69 stock.
