= Frank Pick =

British transport administrator (1878–1941)

- Frank Pick, 1939

Chief Executive/Vice Chairman of London Passenger Transport Board
- In office 1 July 1933 – 18 May 1940
- Preceded by: New position
- Succeeded by: Abolished

President of Institute of Transport
- In office 12 October 1931 – 10 October 1932
- Preceded by: Sir Arthur Stanley
- Succeeded by: Sir David J. Owen

President of Design and Industries Association
- In office 2 December 1932 – 8 December 1934
- Succeeded by: Lord Melchett

Chairman of Council for Art and Industry
- In office 4 January 1934 – 16 March 1939
- Preceded by: New position
- Succeeded by: Sir Frederick Marquis

Personal details
- Born: 23 November 1878 Spalding, Lincolnshire, England
- Died: 7 November 1941 (aged 62) London

Frank Pick Hon. RIBA (23 November 1878 – 7 November 1941) was a British transport administrator. After qualifying as a solicitor in 1902, he worked at the North Eastern Railway, before moving to the Underground Electric Railways Company of London (UERL) in 1906. He was chief executive officer and vice-chairman of the London Passenger Transport Board from its creation in 1933 until 1940.

Pick had a strong interest in design and its use in public life. He steered the development of the London Underground's corporate identity by commissioning eye-catching commercial art, graphic design and modern architecture, establishing a highly recognisable brand, including the first versions of the roundel and typeface still used today.

Under his direction, the UERL's Underground network and associated bus services expanded considerably, reaching out into new areas and stimulating the growth of London's suburbs. His impact on the growth of London between the world wars led to his being likened to Baron Haussmann and Robert Moses.

Pick's interest extended beyond his own organisation. He was a founding member and later served as president of the Design and Industries Association. He was also the first chairman of the Council for Art and Industry and regularly wrote and lectured on design and urban planning subjects. For the government, Pick prepared the transport plan for the mass evacuation of civilians from London at the outbreak of war and produced reports on the wartime use of canals and ports.

== Early life ==
Frank Pick was born on 23 November 1878 at Spalding, Lincolnshire. He was the first child of five born to draper Francis Pick and his wife Fanny Pick (née Clarke). (Note: The names of Pick's siblings were Ethel, Marion, Martin and Sisson.) Pick's paternal grandfather, Charles Pick, was a farmer in Spalding who died in his forties, leaving eight children. His maternal grandfather, Thomas Clarke, was a blacksmith and Wesleyan lay preacher. As a child, Pick was bookish, preferring to read and build collections of moths and butterflies and objects found on the beach rather than take part in sports.

He lived at 27 Bridge Street, where he was born. His father had drapery business Pick & Dinsdale, from the 1870s. By the 1900s, the shop was owned by Berrills Ltd; Berrills closed in 1971. His father died in late June 1922.

Before becoming a draper, Pick's father had had an ambition to become a lawyer and he encouraged his son to follow this career. Pick attended St Peter's School in York on a scholarship, and was articled to a York solicitor, George Crombie, in March 1897. He qualified in January 1902 and completed a law degree at the University of London in the same year, but did not apply to practice.

In 1902, Pick began working for the North Eastern Railway. He worked first in the company's traffic statistics department before becoming assistant to the company's general manager, Sir George Gibb in 1904. In 1904, Pick married Mabel Mary Caroline Woodhouse. The couple had no biological children. They did however have an adopted daughter, named Constance.

== London's transport ==
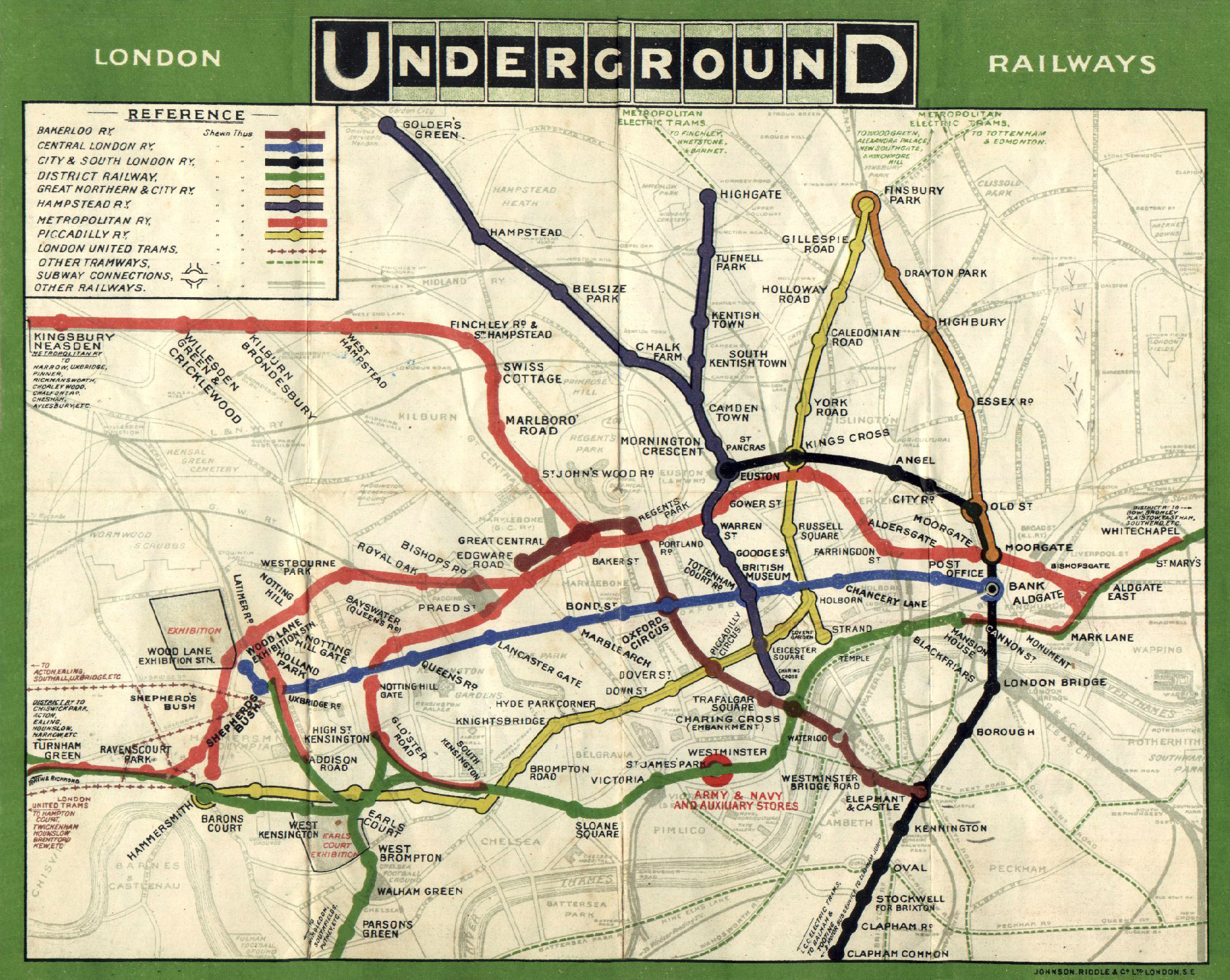
The first Underground branded map from 1908, showing the UERL's lines and those of the other tube companies and the Metropolitan Railway

In 1906, Gibb was appointed managing director of the UERL. At Gibb's invitation, Pick also moved to the UERL to continue working as his assistant. The UERL controlled the District Railway and, during 1906 and 1907, opened three deep-level tube lines – the Baker Street and Waterloo Railway (Bakerloo tube), the Charing Cross, Euston and Hampstead Railway (Hampstead tube) and the Great Northern, Piccadilly and Brompton Railway (Piccadilly tube). (Note: A "tube" railway is an underground railway constructed in a cylindrical tunnel by the use of a tunnelling shield, usually deep below ground level.)

The UERL had financial problems. Ticket prices were low and passenger numbers were significantly below the pre-opening estimates. (Note: In the Bakerloo Tube's first twelve months of operation, it carried 20.5 million passengers, less than sixty per cent of the 35 million predicted. The Piccadilly Tube achieved 26 million of a predicted 60 million and the Hampstead Tube managed 25 million of a predicted 50 million. For the District Railway, the UERL had predicted an increase to 100 million passengers after electrification, but achieved only 55 million.) The lower than expected passenger numbers were partly the result of competition between the UERL's lines and those of the other tube and sub-surface railway companies. The spread of street-level electric trams and motor buses, replacing slower, horse-drawn road transport, also took a large number of passengers away from the trains.

=== Branding ===
By 1908, Pick had become publicity officer responsible for marketing and it was at this time that, working with the company's general manager Albert Stanley, he began developing the strong corporate identity and visual style for which the London Underground later became famous, including the introduction of the "UNDERGROUND" brand. Pick's philosophy on design was that "the test of the goodness of a thing is its fitness for use. If it fails on this first test, no amount of ornamentation or finish will make it any better; it will only make it more expensive, more foolish."

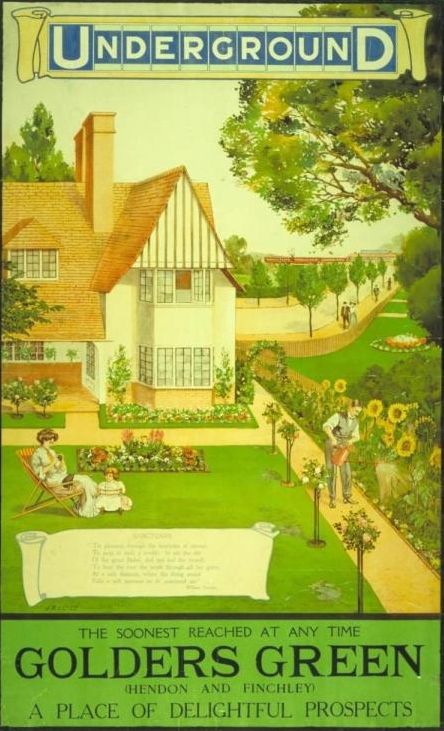
One of Pick's first poster commissions from 1908, extolling the benefits of living in Golders Green, which the Underground had recently reached

Pick became traffic development officer in 1909 and commercial manager in 1912. Albert Stanley replaced Gibb as managing director in 1910. During 1912 and 1913, the UERL increased its control over transport services in London by purchasing two tube railways, the City & South London Railway (C&SLR) and Central London Railway (CLR), and a number of bus and tram companies. (Note: The UERL's bus and tram acquisitions included the London General Omnibus Company, London United Tramways, Metropolitan Electric Tramways and South Metropolitan Electric Tramways.) One of Pick's responsibilities was to increase passenger numbers, and he believed that the best way to do so was by encouraging increased patronage of the company's services outside peak hours. He commissioned posters which promoted the Underground's trains and London General Omnibus Company's (LGOC's) buses as a means of reaching the countryside around London and attractions within the city. Realising that variety was important to maintain travellers' interest, he commissioned designs from artists working in many different styles. (Note: Amongst the well-known artists that produced designs for the Underground were, Edward McKnight Kauffer, Paul Nash, Graham Sutherland and Man Ray.)

At the same time, he rationalised bus routes to ensure that they complemented and acted as feeder services for the company's railway lines, tripling the number of LGOC-operated routes during 1912 and extending the area covered to five times its previous size. Sunday excursion services to leisure destinations were implemented to fully utilise otherwise idle buses and agreements were established with rural bus operators to coordinate services rather than compete with them.

Pick introduced a common advertising policy, improving the appearance of stations by standardising poster sizes, limiting the number used and controlling their positioning. Before he took control of advertising, posters had been stuck up on any available surface on station buildings and platform walls in a crowded jumble of shapes and sizes that led to complaints from passengers that it was difficult to find the station name. Pick standardised commercial poster sizes on printers' double crown sheets, arranging these in organised groups to enable the station name to be easily seen. The Underground's own promotional posters were smaller, using single or paired double royal sheets, and were arranged separately from the commercial advertising. (Note: A double crown sheet was 30 by 20 inches (760 mm × 510 mm); Pick's scheme allowed for these to be grouped in sets of four, eight, 12 or 16 sheets. A double royal sheet was 40 by 25 inches (1,020 mm × 640 mm).) Pick described the process: "after many fumbling experiments I arrived at some notion of how poster advertising ought to be. Everyone seemed quite pleased and I got a reputation that really sprang out of nothing." (Note: The output of publicity material was considerable. In the mid-1930s, around 700 full size and 150 smaller posters were produced each year, all of which Pick expected to achieve "directness" and "give a unitary or single impression".)

To make the Underground Group's posters and signage more distinctive, he commissioned calligrapher and typographer Edward Johnston to design a clear new typeface. Pick specified to Johnston in 1913 that he wanted a typeface that would ensure that the Underground Group's posters would not be mistaken for advertisements; it should have "the bold simplicity of the authentic lettering of the finest periods" and belong "unmistakably to the twentieth century". Johnston's sans serif "Underground" typeface, (now known as Johnston) was first used in 1916 and was so successful that, with minor modifications in recent years, it is still in use today.

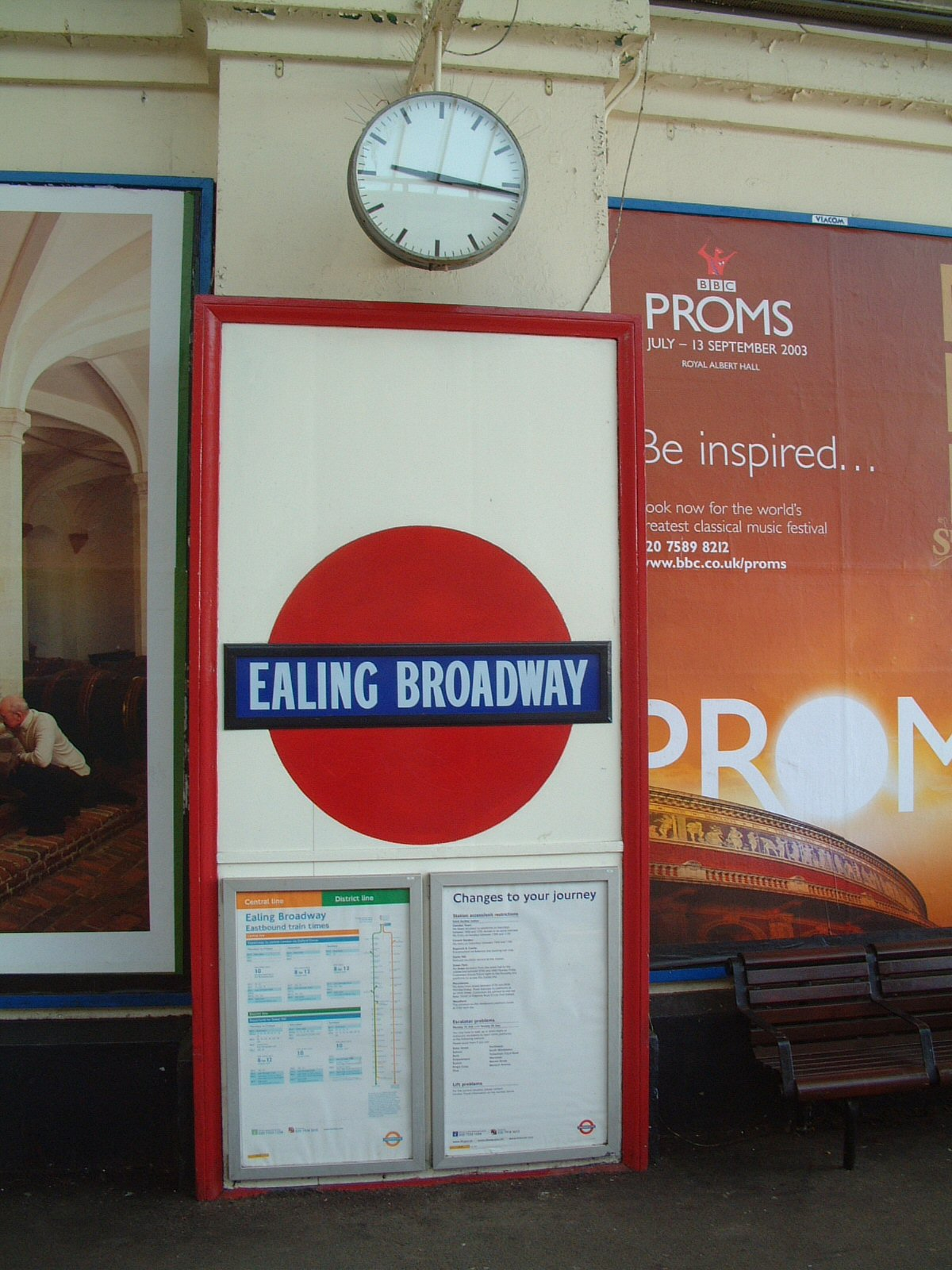
One of the early red disc station "bulls-eyes" introduced by Frank Pick, still in place at Ealing Broadway

In conjunction with his changes to poster display arrangements, Pick experimented with the positioning and sizing of station name signs on platforms, which were often inadequate in number or poorly placed. In 1908, he settled on an arrangement where the sign was backed by a red disc to make it stand out clearly, creating the "bulls-eye" device – the earliest form of what is today known as the roundel. In 1909, Pick started to combine the "bulls-eye" and the "UNDERGROUND" brand on posters and station buildings, but was not satisfied with the arrangement.

By 1916, he had decided to adapt the logo used by the LGOC, the Underground Group's bus company, which was in the form of a ring with a bar bearing the name "GENERAL" across the centre. Pick commissioned Johnston to redesign the "bulls-eye" and the form used today is based on that developed by Johnston and first used in 1919.

=== Expansion ===
In 1919, with a return to normality after the First World War, Pick began developing plans to extend the Underground network out into suburbs that lacked adequate transport services. The only major extensions made to the Underground network since the three tube lines had opened were the extension of the District Railway to Uxbridge in 1910, and the extension of the Bakerloo tube to Watford Junction between 1913 and 1917. Approved schemes put on hold during the war were revived: the CLR was extended to Ealing Broadway in 1920, the Hampstead tube was extended to Edgware between 1923 and 1924 and the C&SLR was reconstructed and extended to Camden Town between 1922 and 1924. Finance for the latter two extensions was obtained through the government's Trade Facilities Acts which underwrote loans for public works as a means of alleviating unemployment.

For new lines, Pick first considered extending Underground services to the northeast of London where the mainline suburban services of the Great Northern Railway (GNR) and Great Eastern Railway (GER) were poor and unreliable. Studies were carried out for an extension of the Piccadilly tube on GNR tracks to New Barnet and Enfield or on a new route to Wood Green and plans were developed for an extension of the CLR along GER tracks to Chingford and Ongar, but both mainline companies strongly opposed the Underground's encroachment into their territories.

Wanting to make maximum use of the government's financial backing, which was only available for a limited period, Pick did not have time to press the Underground's case for these extensions. Instead he developed a plan for an extension of the C&SLR southwest from Clapham Common to Sutton in Surrey. Pick still faced strong opposition from the London, Brighton and South Coast Railway and the London and South Western Railway which operated in the area, but the Underground had the advantage of already having an approval for the last few miles of the route as part of an unused prewar permission for a new line from Wimbledon to Sutton. The railway companies challenged the need for a new service, claiming it would simply drain passengers from their own trains and that any extension should only run as far as Tooting, but Pick was able to counter their arguments and negotiated a compromise settlement to extend the C&SLR as far as Morden. (Note: The Wimbledon to Sutton line was constructed by the Southern Railway and was opened in 1930. In conjunction with the C&SLR's southward extension, the C&SLR and Hampstead tube were linked between Charing Cross (now Embankment) and Kennington stations, creating the basis of what is now the Underground's Northern Line.)

Even before the C&SLR extension had been completed in 1926, possibilities for the northward extension of the Piccadilly tube began to reappear. From 1922, a series of press campaigns called for the improvement of services at the GNR's Finsbury Park station where interchanges between tube lines, mainline trains, buses and trams were notoriously bad. In June 1923, a petition from 30,000 local residents was submitted to Parliament, and in 1925, the government called a public inquiry to review options. Pick presented plans to relieve the congestion at Finsbury Park by extending the Piccadilly tube north to Southgate.

Opposition from the London and North Eastern Railway (successor to the GNR following the 1923 grouping of railway companies) was again considerable and based on claims that the new Underground line would take passengers from the mainline services. Using data from the Bakerloo tube, Hampstead tube and C&SLR extensions, Pick demonstrated that the route planned for the new line would stimulate new residential development and increase passenger numbers for all rail operators in the area, increasing those on the Piccadilly tube by 50 million per year. (Note: In evidence to the parliamentary committee on Piccadilly tube passengers arriving at Finsbury Park, Pick commented that the GNR's steam train service from the station was so poor that "it is extraordinary how small a proportion of this traffic changes to the mainline railway. Of every hundred passengers arriving by the tube seventy-eight continue their journey by road transport ... You are ladling out traffic from a bucket and picking it up in a teacup".)

Parliamentary approval was granted in 1930 to extend the Piccadilly tube north beyond Southgate to a terminus at Cockfosters. The approval also included complementary extensions of the Piccadilly tube from its western terminus at Hammersmith to supplement District Railway services to Hounslow and South Harrow. The development was again financed with government backed loans, this time through the Development (Loan Guarantees and Grants) Act 1929. To ensure the most efficient integration between the new tube line and the UERL's bus and tram operations, the stations were located further apart than in central areas and where road transport services could be arranged to deliver and collect the most passengers. At Manor House, the station was designed with subway exits directly on to pedestrian islands in the road served by the local trams. (Note: The new stations on the northern extension opened in stages between September 1932 and July 1933. In the west, the Piccadilly line services to Hounslow and South Harrow started between July 1932 and March 1933. The Piccadilly line service was further extended to Uxbridge in October 1933.)

=== Design ===
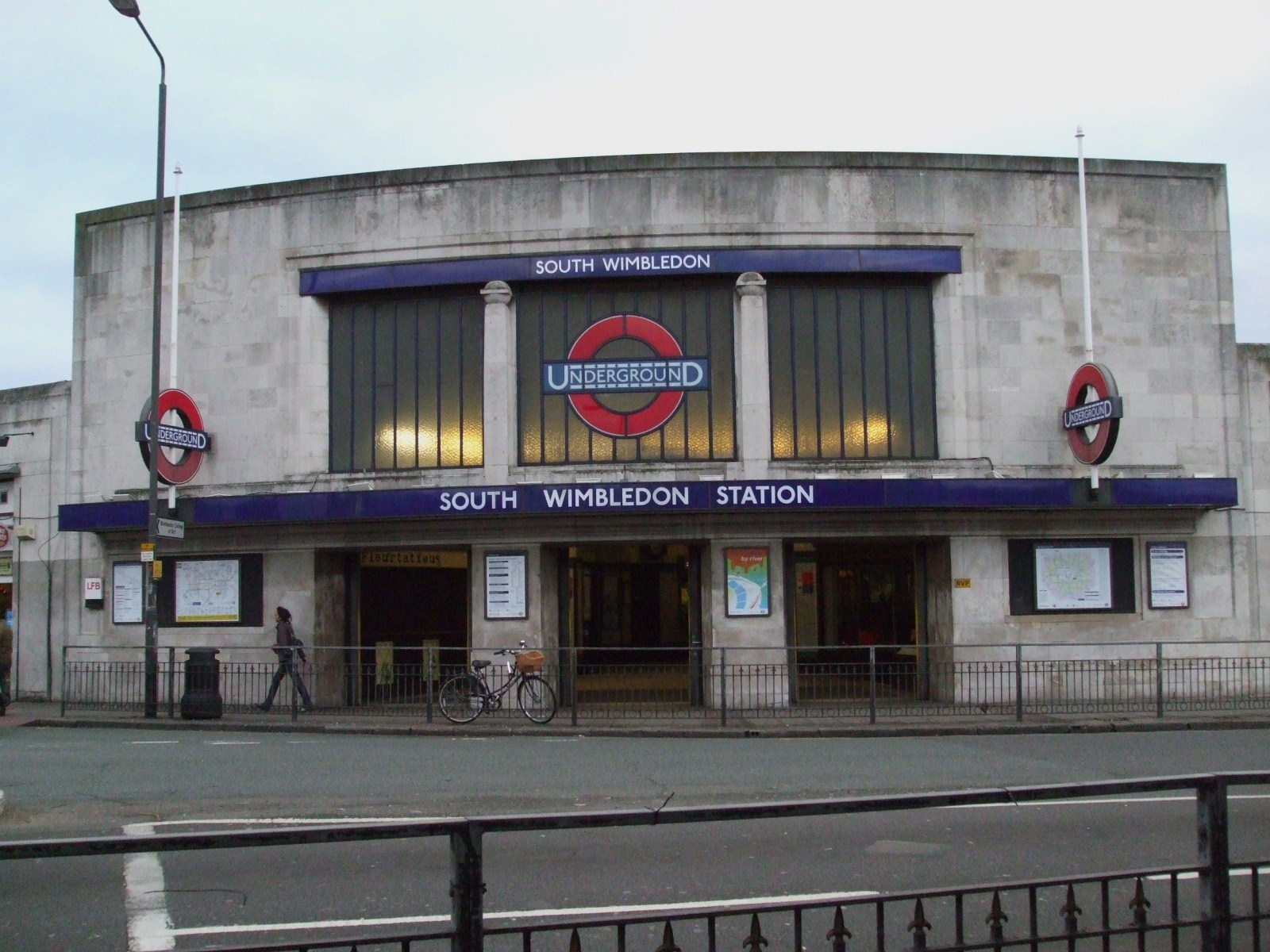
South Wimbledon station (1926), one of Charles Holden's new stations on the C&SLR extension to Morden

In 1924, with plans for the C&SLR extension under development, Pick commissioned Charles Holden to design the station buildings in a new style. The designs replaced a set by the Underground's own architect, Stanley Heaps, which Pick had found unsatisfactory. (Note: Heaps had recently designed the stations for the extension of the Hampstead tube from Golders Green to Edgware. These stations, in a suburban setting, were in a pavilion style, which Pick did not think suitable for the more built-up areas through which most of the Morden extension would run.) Pick had first met Holden at the Design and Industries Association (DIA) in 1915, and he saw the modernist architect as one he could work with to define what Pick called "a new architectural idiom".

Pick wanted to streamline and simplify the design of the stations to make them welcoming, brightly lit and efficient with large, uncluttered ticket halls for the rapid sale of tickets and quick access to the trains via escalators. (Note: "I may say that we are going to build our stations upon the Morden extension railway to the most modern pattern. We are going to discard entirely all ornament. We are going to build in reinforced concrete. The station will be simply a hole in the wall, everything being sacrificed to the doorway and some notice above to tell you to what the doorway leads. We are going to represent the DIA gone mad, and in order that I may go mad in good company I have got Holden to see that we do it properly.") At these new stations, tickets were issued from a number of "passimeters", glazed booths in the centre of the ticket hall, rather than the traditional ticket office windows set to one side. (Note: The first passimeter had been installed in 1921 at Kilburn Park, one of the first tube stations built with escalators rather than lifts.)

Pick was pleased with the results and at a DIA dinner in 1926 proclaimed "that a new style of architectural decoration will arise" leading to a "Modern London – modern not garbled classic or Renaissance." Amongst Pick's next commissions for Holden were the redesign of Piccadilly Circus station (1925–28), where a wide subterranean concourse and ticket hall were built beneath the road junction, (Note: The rebuilt ticket hall at Piccadilly Circus saw the introduction of a new type of passenger-operated ticket machine that printed tickets as needed. The new machines occupied less space than older machines that held a stock of each type of ticket and supported Pick's aim of streamlining station operations. Combined with the introduction of escalators, they reduced the time for passengers to get from the street to the platform by a useful 2½ minutes.) and the Underground Group's new headquarters building at 55 Broadway, St James's (1925–1929).

The new headquarters building was on an awkwardly shaped site, partly over the platforms and tracks of St James's Park station. Although Holden's practice had not designed such a large office building, it did have experience of large hospital design, which Pick saw as complementary to the design of a modern office building. When completed, the twelve-storey, 176-foot (54 m) high cruciform building was the tallest in London and the tower dominated the skyline. The building was well received by architectural critics and won Holden the RIBA's London Architecture Medal for 1929.

Two sculptures commissioned for the building were less well received, generating considerable controversy in the media. The nudity and primitive carving of Day and Night by Jacob Epstein led to calls for them to be removed from the building and the board of the Underground Group considered replacing them with new sculptures by another artist. Although he privately admitted later that the sculptures were not to his taste, Pick publicly supported Holden's selection of Epstein as sculptor and offered to resign over the matter. The crisis was averted when Epstein was persuaded to reduce the length of the penis of one of the figures and the sculptures remained in place.

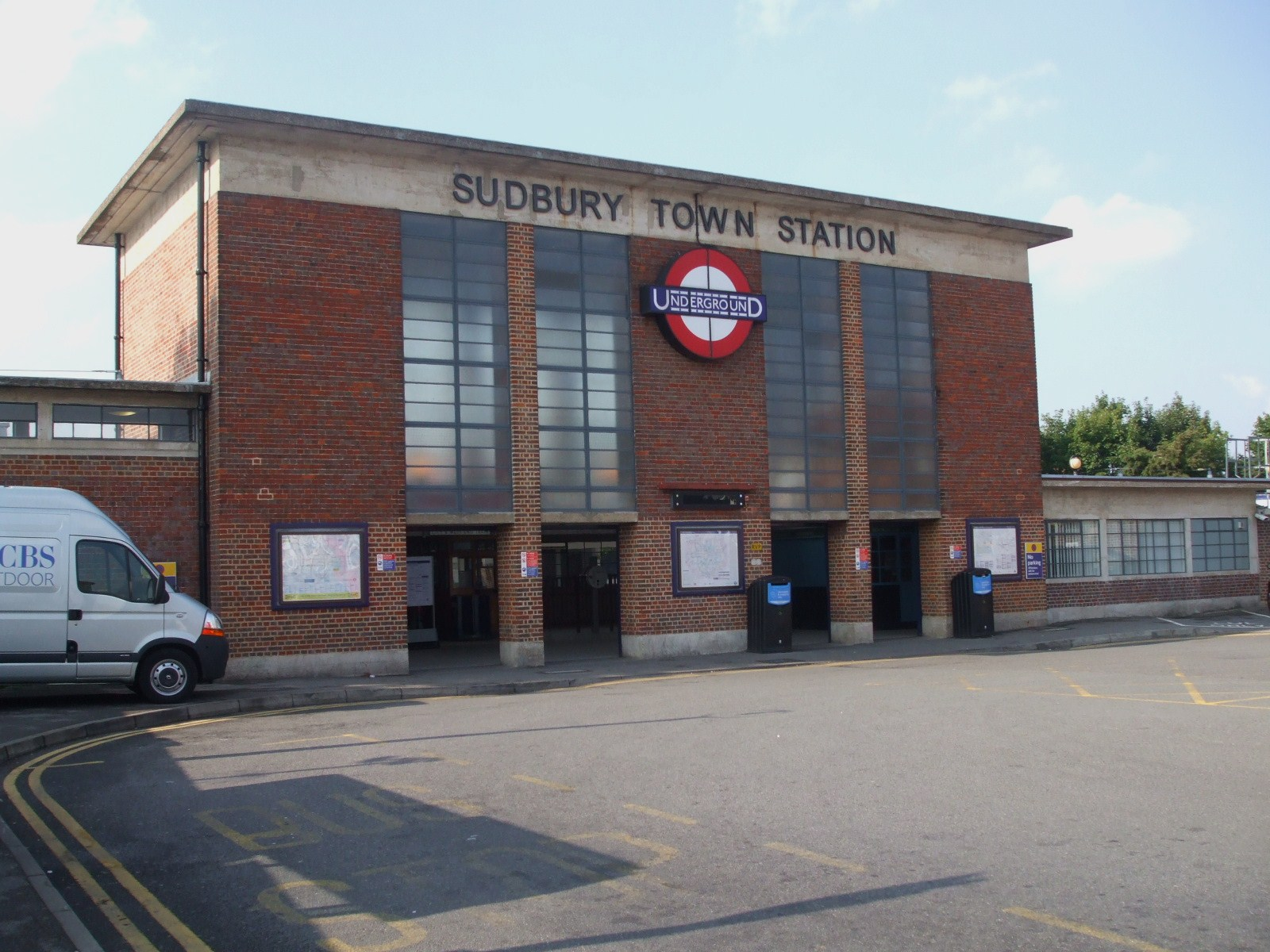
Sudbury Town station (1931), the first of Charles Holden's stations on the Piccadilly line

Pick wanted a new type of building for the more open sites of the stations on the Piccadilly line's extensions. To decide what this new type should look like, he and Holden made a short tour of Germany, Denmark, Sweden and the Netherlands in July and August 1930 to see the latest developments in modern architecture.

Pick was disappointed with much of the new architecture that he saw in Germany and Sweden, considering it either too extreme or unsatisfactorily experimental. The architecture in the Netherlands was much more to his liking, particularly buildings by Willem Marinus Dudok in Hilversum. Although the architecture in Denmark was not considered remarkable, Pick was impressed with the way in which designers there were often responsible for all elements of a building including the interior fixtures and fittings.

The designs Pick commissioned from Holden (1931–33) established a new standard for the Underground, with the prototype station at Sudbury Town being described by architectural historian Nikolaus Pevsner as a "landmark" and the start of "the 'classic' phase of Underground architecture". To ensure that the new stations achieved the complete and coherent design that he wanted, Pick instructed the engineering departments to provide Holden with full details of all equipment needed for the stations. After late equipment changes by the engineers at the first few new stations compromised the integrated design, Pick took personal charge of the coordination of the architectural and engineering elements.

In the mid-1930s when the introduction of trolleybuses to replace trams required the installation of new street poles to support overhead wiring, Pick was keenly interested that the design of the poles was coordinated to accommodate all of the possible equipment and signage that might be needed. He also oversaw the designs of the new bus stops and bus shelters that were installed when specified stopping points were introduced for bus services.

=== London Passenger Transport Board ===
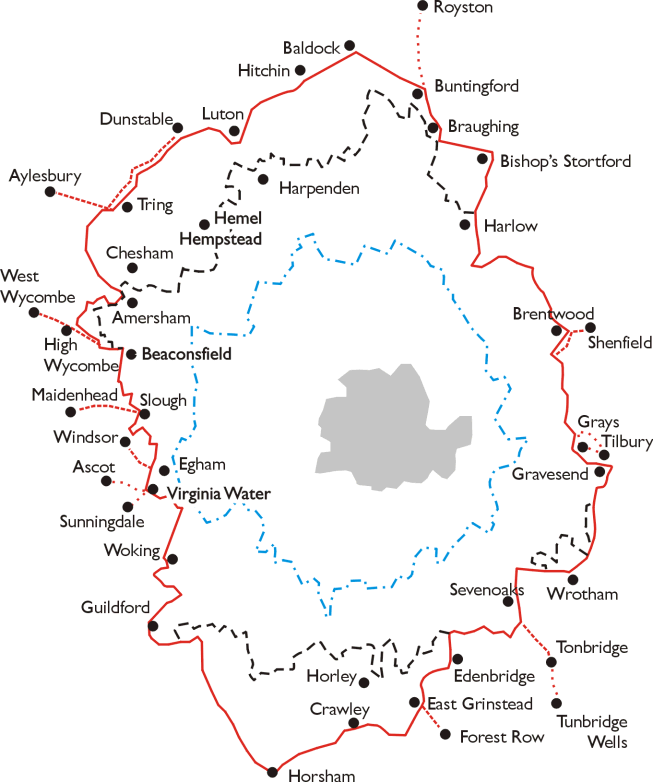
The London Passenger Transport Area (outlined in red) extended far beyond the area of the County of London (shaded grey)

At the beginning of the 1920s, with vehicle numbers depleted by wartime service in France and Belgium, the Underground Group's bus operations began to experience a surge in competition from a large number of new independent bus operators. These small operators were unregulated and preyed on the group's most profitable routes taking away a large number of its passengers and a large amount of its income. Albert Stanley (ennobled as Lord Ashfield in 1920) and Pick fought back by calling on parliament to regulate bus operations in the capital. The London Traffic Act 1924 granted their request by establishing the London Traffic Area to regulate road passenger traffic within London and the surrounding districts.

Throughout the 1920s, Pick led the Underground Group's efforts to coordinate its services with the municipal tram operators, the Metropolitan Railway and the suburban mainline rail services. The aim was to achieve a pooling of income between all of the operators and remove wasteful competition. At the end of 1930, a solution was announced in a bill for the formation of the London Passenger Transport Board (LPTB), a public corporation which was to take control of the Underground Group, the Metropolitan Railway and the majority of the bus and tram operators within an area designated as the London Passenger Transport Area covering the County of London and Middlesex and parts of Buckinghamshire, Essex, Hertfordshire, Kent, Surrey and Sussex. (Note: The mainline railways' suburban lines remained outside of the LPTB's control, but the railway companies did participate in the common fund to pool revenue for suburban passenger services.)

Pick had become joint managing director of the Underground Group in 1928, and when, on 1 July 1933, the group was taken over by the LPTB, he became chief executive officer and vice-chairman, on an annual salary of £10,000 (approximately equivalent to £619,000 in 2025). Ashfield was chairman. Pick led the board's negotiations on the compensation to be paid to the owners and shareholders of each of the transport operations being taken over. (Note: In a lecture given in 1934, Pick summarised the work involved in the creation of the LPTB as a negotiation to take-over "five railway companies, fourteen municipally owned tramway undertakings, three company-owned tramway undertakings, sixty-six omnibus and coach companies and the whole or part of not less sixty-nine other omnibus and coach companies".)

With the majority of London's transport operations now under the control of a single organisation, Pick was able to commence the next round of improvements. On the Metropolitan Railway (renamed the Metropolitan line), Pick and Ashfield began to rationalise services. The barely used and loss-making Brill and Verney Junction branches beyond Aylesbury were closed in 1935 and 1936. Freight services were reduced and electrification of the remaining steam operated sections of the line was planned.

In 1935, the availability of government-backed loans to stimulate the flagging economy allowed Pick to promote system-wide improvements under the New Works Programme for 1935–1940, including the transfer of the Metropolitan line's Stanmore services to the Bakerloo line in 1939, the Northern line's Northern Heights project and extension of the Central line to Ongar in Essex and Denham in Buckinghamshire. (Note: Much of the works were interrupted by World War II. After the War, changed priorities, funding shortages and the creation of London's Metropolitan Green Belt led to much of the Northern line expansion plan being cancelled and delays in completing other plans.)

During 1938 and 1939, with war anticipated, an increasing part of Pick's time was spent in planning for the approaching conflict. The Railway Executive Committee was reconstituted in 1938 to act as a central coordinating body for the country's railways with Pick as the LPTB's representative. This role absorbed most of his time after the committee took over control of the railways on 1 September 1939. Following a disagreement with other members of the LPTB board over the government's proposals to limit the dividend that it could pay to its shareholders, Pick stated his intention to retire from the board at the end of his seven-year appointment in May 1940. (Note: The disagreement was over a matter of principle: whether the board should accept the government's plan to limit the LPTB's dividend payments to a fraction of the amount that it was statutorily required to pay. Ashfield and other board members were prepared to accept the proposal, but Pick believed that the board should not agree to the imposed limitation of its responsibility. The matter was somewhat technical, as the statutory dividend had not once been paid in full since the LPTB's creation in 1933.)

Pick had previously suggested a reorganisation of the LPTB's senior management structure and hoped to be able to continue with the organisation in some sort of joint general manager position. Ashfield chose not to find such a continuing role for Pick and, on 18 May 1940, to the surprise of many within the organisation, Pick retired from the LPTB board, officially due to failing health. Pick's post of chief executive was abolished and replaced with a group of six heads of department.

== Other activities ==
A thing may be right and beautiful and true without being lovable, though a thing cannot be lovable without being also in itself right and beautiful and true. Love is the harmony which such a thing awakes in the emotions; it is the harmony of what it feels to be. It adds the heart, as we call it, to the conscience, the sense, and the mind, to make the four great organs of being.

— Frank Pick, Lecture at the Royal Scottish Academy, 1916

Pick's interest in design led to his involvement in the founding, in 1915, of the Design and Industries Association. The organisation aimed to bring manufacturers and designers together to improve the quality of industrial design. Through his improvements in the UERL's advertising and branding, Pick was considered by many of its members to be taking a practical lead in achieving the organisation's aims and he was soon lecturing on the subject, giving talks during 1916 and 1917 at the Art Workers Guild in London, at the Royal Scottish Academy in Edinburgh and elsewhere.

After the First World War, Pick continued to give talks regularly and published articles on design. He also began to set out his ideas on reconstruction and town planning, an area of design he became interested in through its connection to transport planning. He wrote and lectured extensively on this subject during the 1920s and 1930s including presenting a 14,000-word paper to the Institute of Transport in 1927 and addressing the International Housing and Town Planning Congress in 1939. Concerned about the uncontrolled and unchecked growth of London, partly facilitated by the new lines that London Underground was building, Pick was a strong supporter of the need for a green belt around the capital to maintain open space within reach of urban areas.

One day the ice will descend and blot out all traces of man's works. The earth will grow cold. Nature will return to her kingdom and spread her snowy pall over the last man, and there will be nothing but barren rocks again ... Man will have disappeared from the face of the earth with the world that he had made. His day will be done. And the evening and the morning were the eighth day. Will man be able to say:"and, behold, it was very good?"

— Frank Pick, This is the World that Man Made, or The New Creation, 1922

In 1922, he wrote and published privately a pamphlet This is the World that Man Made, or The New Creation that was influenced by the rationalist writing of Ray Lankester. In it Pick was pessimistic that mankind was not achieving its creative potential. He returned to the subject in lectures he gave in the 1930s when he outlined his concern that at some not too distant point progress in civilisation would come to a natural end and a stable condition would arise where, he believed, it would be hard to maintain creativity and an entropic decline would follow.

Later, in the last year of his life and with the Second World War under way, he published two booklets on postwar reconstruction, Britain Must Rebuild and Paths to Peace. Pick wrote the introduction to the English translation of Walter Gropius's The New Architecture and the Bauhaus published in 1935.

Beside his positions at the UERL and LPTB, Pick held a number of industrial administrative and advisory positions. In 1917, during the First World War, Pick was appointed to be head of the Mines Directorate's Household Fuel and Lighting Department at the Board of Trade where Albert Stanley was the President. Pick was responsible for the control of the rationing and distribution of domestic fuel supplies. He remained in this position until June 1919. Also in 1917, Pick was appointed as a member of the Special Committee advising the Civil Aerial Transport Committee on technical and practical questions of aerial transport. From 12 December 1917 he was a member of the main committee.

In 1928, he was appointed as a member of the Royal Commission on Police Powers and Procedure. He also served as a member of the London and Home Counties Traffic Advisory Committee and as a member of the Crown Lands Advisory Committee.

Pick was President of the Institute of Transport for 1931/32. He was President of the Design and Industries Association from 1932 to 1934 and the chairman of the Board of Trade's Council for Art and Industry from 1934 to 1939.

During 1938, the government appointed Pick to plan the transport operations for the evacuation of civilians from London. Initially scheduled for 30 September 1938, the plans were cancelled when Neville Chamberlain's Munich conference with Adolf Hitler averted war that year, but were activated a year later at the beginning of September 1939 on the declaration of war with Germany. After leaving the LPTB, Pick visited British ports for the Ministry of Transport to prepare a report on methods of improving port operations and cargo handling. In August 1940, he reluctantly accepted the position of director-general of the Ministry of Information.

His time at the Ministry of Information was short and unhappy and he left after four months and returned to the Ministry of Transport, where he carried out studies on improvements in the use of Britain's canals and rivers.

== Personality ==
Biographers have characterised Pick as being "very shy", and "brilliant but lonely". Christian Barman described him as a person who inspired conflicting opinions about his personality and his actions: "a man about whom so many people held so many different views". Pick acknowledged that he could be difficult to work with: "I have always kept in mind my own frailties – a short temper. Impatience with fools, quickness rather than thoroughness. I am a bad hand at the gracious word or casual congratulation." His moralistic character led to friends giving him the nickname "Jonah".

Pick valued criticism and savoured challenging debate, though he complained that he found it difficult to get people to stand up to him. UERL board member Sir Ernest Clark considered Pick to be perhaps too efficient and unable to fully delegate and relinquish responsibility: "his own efficiency has a bad effect on the efficiency of others... How can the housemaid take pride in a job to which the mistress will insist on putting the finishing touch?" Pick's friend Noel Carrington thought that his attention to detail made him the "ideal inspector general."

Pick ran his office on a fortnightly cycle and his workload was prodigious. (Note: On Mondays, Pick would chair a long engineering meeting reviewing new construction works, equipment and operational requirements. Tuesday's meetings alternated between accounts and staffing issues, the latter including matters of industrial relations. The subject of Wednesday's meeting was traffic, reviewing the statistics for the previous week's passenger numbers, revenue and service interruptions. Thursday's meetings alternated between land and estate matters and publicity. Fridays Pick used for visits to the company's depots, garages, stations or workshops or to drive over new routes being planned. Minutes of meetings were to be typed up by the end of the following day for his scrutiny that evening. Weekends were spent alternately at his country home in Charmouth, where he would spend five or six hours on Saturday evening working on business papers, or in London, where he would do the same on Saturday mornings.) Barman described Pick's office as a training school for future managers, with a regular turnover of staff who would go on to management positions when Pick thought them ready. (Note: Amongst Pick's assistants in the 1930s were future London Transport chairman Alexander Valentine and vice-chairman Anthony Bull.)

Ashfield considered that Pick possessed "a sterling character and steadfast loyalty", and "an administrative ability which was outstanding", with "a keen analytical mind which was able to seize upon essentials and then drive his way through to his goal, always strengthened by a sure knowledge of the problem and confidence in himself." Charles Holden described Pick's management of meetings: "Here his decisions were those of a benevolent dictator, and the members left the meeting with a clear sense of a task to be performed, difficult, perhaps, and sometimes impossible, as might subsequently prove to be, but usually well worth exploring if only in producing convincing proof of obstacles. Out of these exploratory methods there often emerged new and most interesting solutions, which Pick was quick to appreciate, and to adopt in substitution for his own proposals."

Disliking honours, Pick declined offers of a knighthood and a peerage. He did accept, in 1932, the Soviet Union's Honorary Badge of Merit for his advice on the construction of the Moscow Metro. He was an honorary member of the Royal Institute of British Architects.

== Influences ==
Pick was widely read and was influenced by many writers on scientific, sociological and social matters including works by Alfred North Whitehead, Leonard Hobhouse, Edwin Lankester, Arthur Eddington and John Ruskin. On design, he was influenced by D'Arcy Wentworth Thompson's description of design in nature in On Growth and Form and by architect William Lethaby. His admiration for William Morris led him to adopt Morris's favourite colour of green as his own, using green ink for the majority of his correspondence.

== Legacy ==
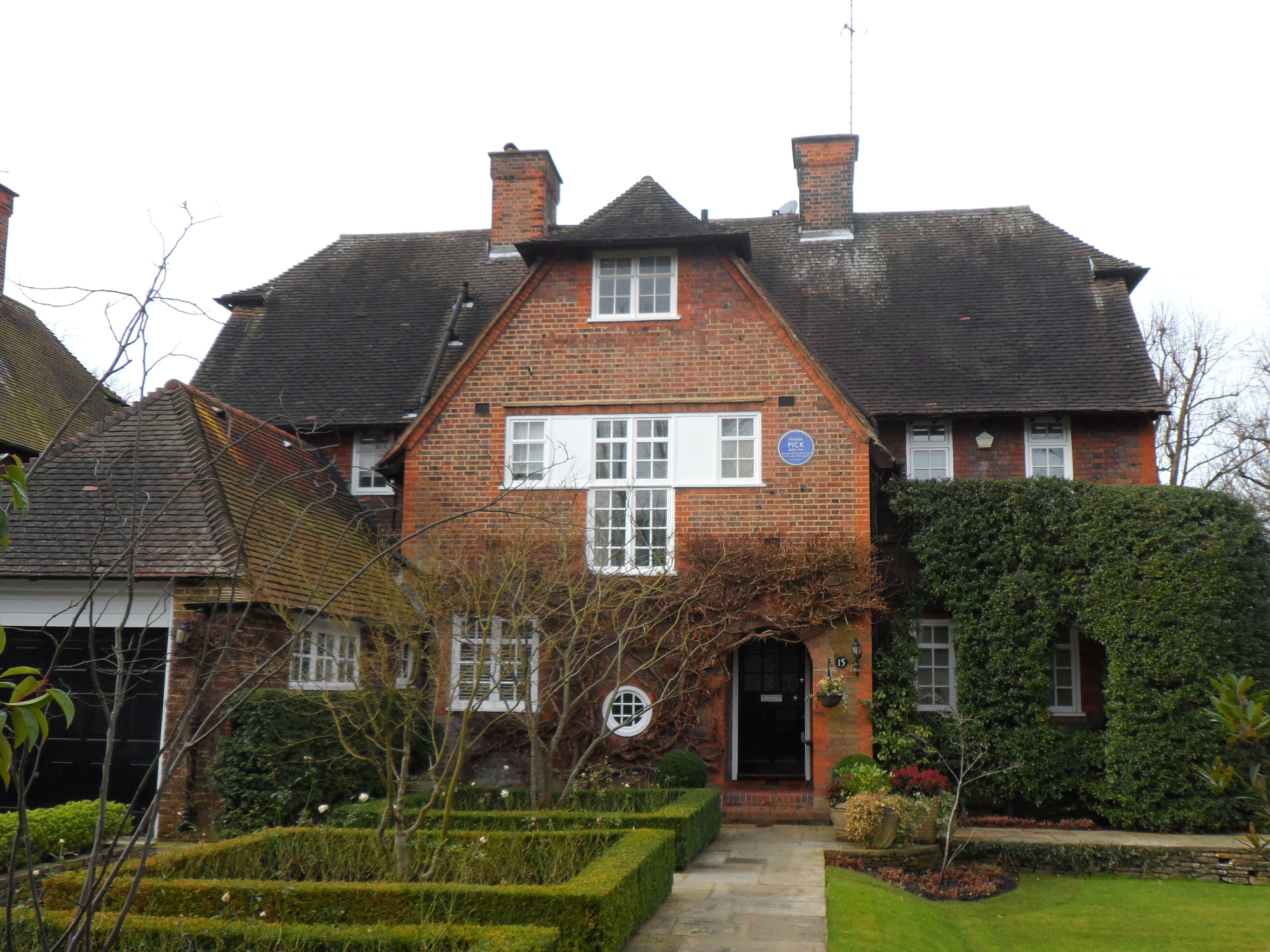
Pick's home at 15 Wildwood Road, Hampstead Garden Suburb

Pick had not been well for some years. (Note: In 1932, Pick suffered from a severe case of bronchitis and congested lungs, which kept him away from work for much of the first half of the year. In mid-1938, concerned about Pick's health, Ashfield had him see a Harley Street consultant. The doctor reported that Pick was suffering from strain and that his workload should be reduced. He warned that an "anxiety of an unexpected sort" should be avoided.) The stresses of his war work took a further toll on his health and he lost two stone during his travels around the country to research his report on the canal industry. Although exhausted at the end of the tour, he wrote to friends that he was struggling with the idleness and was hoping for something new to do. He died at his home, 15 Wildwood Road, Hampstead Garden Suburb, on 7 November 1941 from a cerebral haemorrhage.

His funeral was held at Golders Green Crematorium on 11 November 1941 and a memorial service was held at St Peter's Church, Eaton Square on 13 November 1941.

Working with Ashfield, Pick's impact on London's transport system was considerable. Transport historian Christian Wolmar considers it "almost impossible to exaggerate the high regard in which [London Transport] was held during its all too brief heyday, attracting official visitors from around the world eager to learn the lessons of its success and apply them in their own countries" and that "it represented the apogee of a type of confident public administration ... with a reputation that any state organisation today would envy ... only made possible by the brilliance of its two famous leaders, Ashfield and Pick." In his obituary of Pick, Charles Holden described him as "the Maecenas of our time."

Writing in 1968, Nikolaus Pevsner described Pick as "the greatest patron of the arts whom this century has so far produced in England, and indeed the ideal patron of our age." Considering Pick's public statements on art and life, art historian Kenneth Clark suggested that "in a different age he might have become a sort of Thomas Aquinas". Historian Michael Saler compared Pick's influence on London Transport to that of Lord Reith on the BBC's development during the same interwar period. Urban planner Sir Peter Hall suggested that Pick "had as much influence on London's development in the twentieth century as Haussmann had on that of Paris in the nineteenth", and historian Anthony Sutcliffe compared him to Robert Moses, the city planner responsible for many urban infrastructure projects in New York.

Pick's will was probated at £36,000 (£1.5 million in present-day terms). In his will he bequeathed a Francis Dodd painting, Ely, to the Tate Gallery. Transport for London and the London Transport Museum hold archives of Pick's business and personal papers.

As part of the Transported by Design programme of activities, on 15 October 2015, after two months of public voting, the work of Frank Pick was elected by Londoners as one of the 10 favourite transport design icons.

Pick is commemorated with a memorial plaque at St Peter's School, York, unveiled in 1953 by Lord Latham, and a blue plaque was erected at his Golders Green home in 1981.

Pick is commemorated with a permanent memorial at Piccadilly Circus station by the BAFTA-winning and Turner Prize-nominated artists Langlands & Bell. The work, entitled Beauty < Immortality, was commissioned by London Transport Museum and installed by Art on the Underground (Transport for London's official art programme). It was unveiled on 7 November 2016, the 75th anniversary of Pick's death.

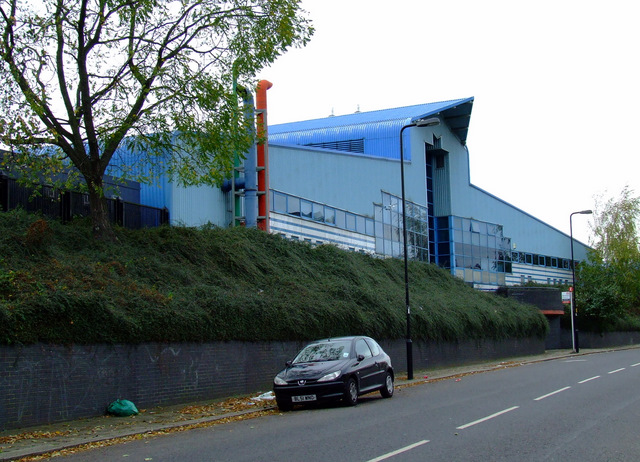
Frank Pick House, Acton

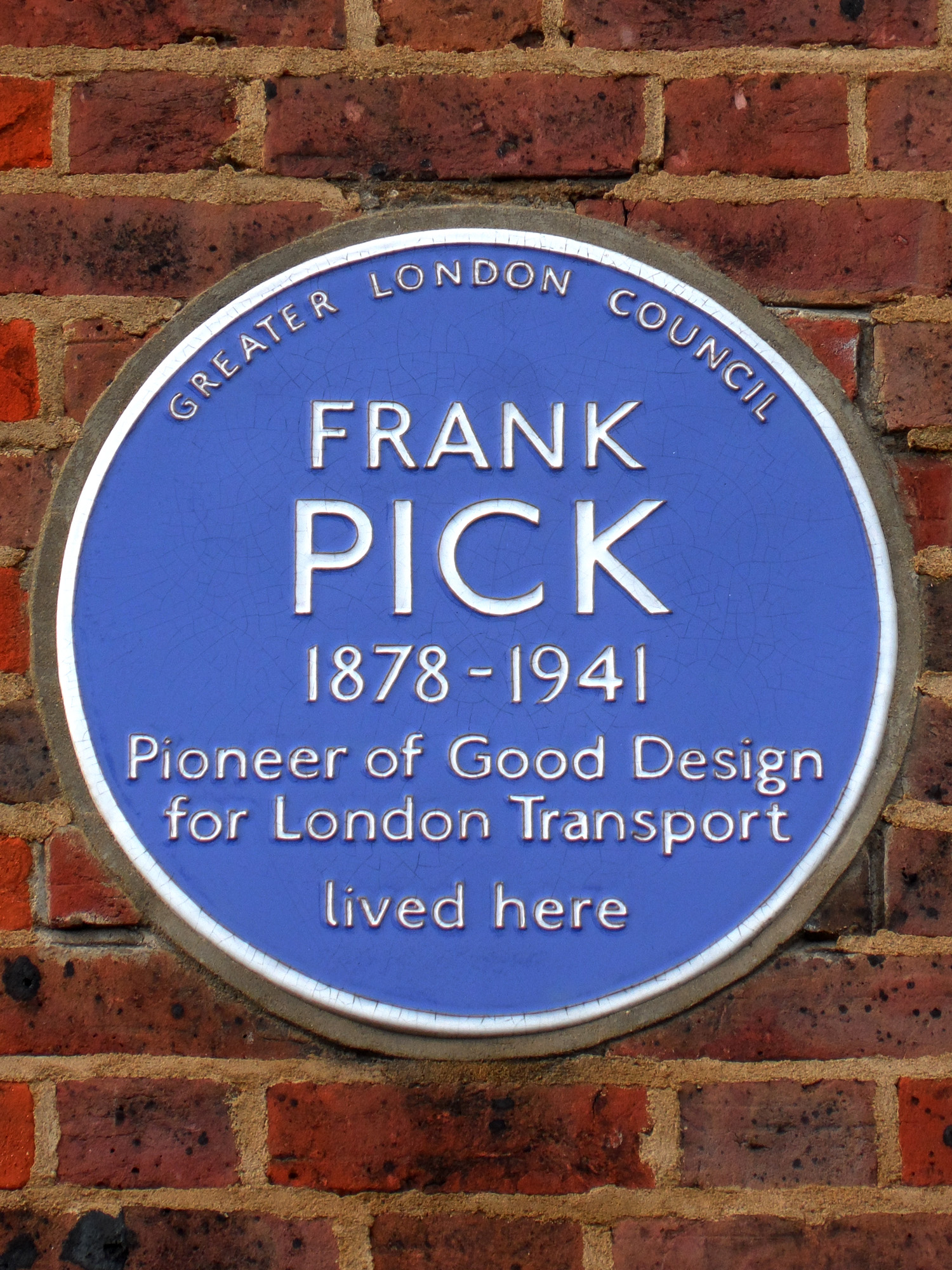
Blue plaque at 15 Wildwood Road

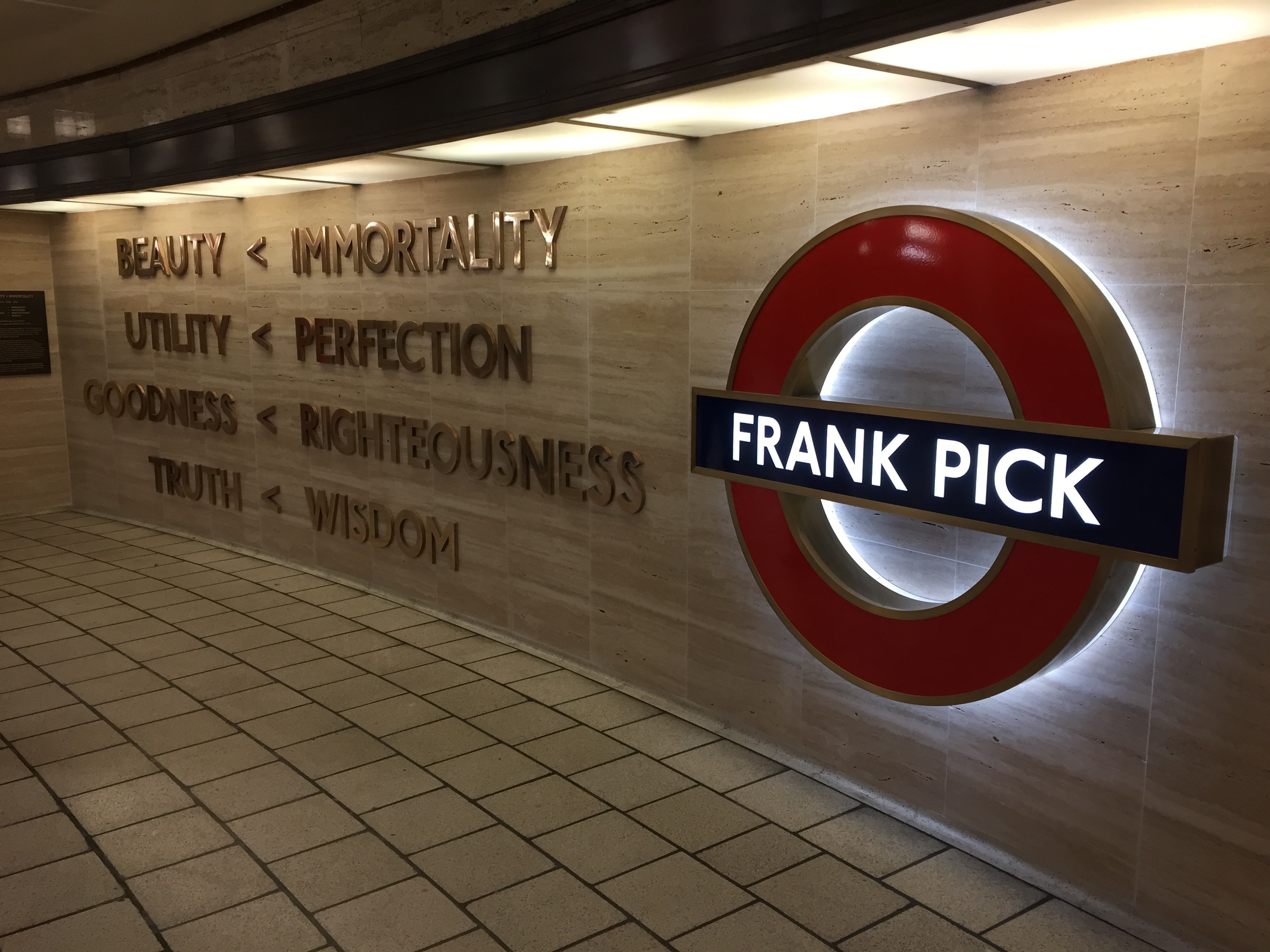
Beauty < Immortality, at Piccadilly Circus station

Memorials to Frank Pick

== See also ==
- London Transport (brand)

== Notes and references ==
Notes

Bibliography

- Baird, John, ed. (1918). Reports of the Civil Aerial Transport Committee (PDF). His Majesty's Stationery Office.
- Barker, Theo (2004). "Albert Henry Stanley (1874–1948)". Oxford Dictionary of National Biography (online ed.). Oxford University Press. doi:10.1093/ref:odnb/36241. (Subscription, Wikipedia Library access or UK public library membership required.)
- Barman, Christian (1979). The Man Who Built London Transport: A Biography of Frank Pick. David & Charles. ISBN 0-7153-7753-1.
- Day, John R; Reed, John (2008) [1963]. The Story of London's Underground. Capital Transport. ISBN 978-1-85414-316-7.
- Elliot, John; Robbins, Michael (October 2008). "Pick Frank (1878–1941), transport administrator". Oxford Dictionary of National Biography (online ed.). Oxford University Press. doi:10.1093/ref:odnb/35522. (Subscription, Wikipedia Library access or UK public library membership required.)
- Hall, Peter (1984). "Chapter 2: Challenges and Responses". In Sutcliffe, Anthony (ed.). Metropolis 1890–1940. Mansell. ISBN 978-0-7201-1616-8.
- Holden, Charles (November 1941). "Obituary: Frank Pick (Hon A.)". Journal of the Royal Institute of British Architects.
- Jones, Ken (1974). The Wotton Tramway (Brill Branch). Locomotion Papers. The Oakwood Press. ISBN 0-85361-149-1.
- Karol, Eitan (2007). Charles Holden: Architect. Shaun Tyas. ISBN 978-1-900289-81-8.
- Pevsner, Nikolaus (1968). Art, Architecture and Design: Victorian and After. Vol. 2. Walker & Company.
- "Pick, Frank". Who Was Who. Oxford University Press/A & C Black. 2007.(subscription required)
- Rose, Douglas (1999) [1980]. The London Underground, A Diagrammatic History. Douglas Rose/Capital Transport. ISBN 1-85414-219-4.
- Saler, Michael T. (2001) [1999]. The Avant-Garde in Interwar England: Medieval Modernism and the London Underground. Oxford University Press. ISBN 0-19-514718-9.
- Sutcliffe, Anthony, ed. (1984). "Chapter 1: Introduction: Urbanization, Planning and the Giant City". Metropolis 1890–1940. Mansell. ISBN 978-0-7201-1616-8.
- Wolmar, Christian (2005) [2004]. The Subterranean Railway: How the London Underground Was Built and How It Changed the City Forever. Atlantic Books. ISBN 1-84354-023-1.
