= Brill Tramway =

Rail line in Buckinghamshire, England (1871–1935)

- Manning Wardle engine Huddersfield at Quainton Road in the late 1890s with the Wotton Tramway's passenger coach of the mid-1870s, an 1895 Oxford & Aylesbury Tramroad passenger coach, and a goods wagon loaded with milk churns

Overview
- Headquarters: Brill (1872–1899); London (1899–1935)
- Locale: Aylesbury Vale
- Dates of operation: 1871–1935
- Successor: Abandoned

Technical
- Track gauge: 4 ft 8 1/2 in (1,435 mm) standard gauge

The Brill Tramway, also known as the Quainton Tramway, Wotton Tramway, Oxford & Aylesbury Tramroad and Metropolitan Railway Brill Branch, (Note: When built, the tramway had no official name; it was referred to in internal correspondence as "The Quainton Tramway". Following the 1872 extension and conversion to passenger use, it was officially named the "Wotton Tramway". On 1 April 1894, the Wotton Tramway was taken over by the Oxford & Aylesbury Tramroad, and retained the O&AT name officially until closure in 1935 despite never running either to Oxford or to Aylesbury. It was commonly known as the Brill Tramway from 1872 onwards (and referred to as such in some official documents such as the agreement establishing the Metropolitan and Great Central Joint Committee), and as the Metropolitan Railway Brill Branch from 1899 to 1935, but neither of these were official names.) was a six-mile (10 km) rail line in the Aylesbury Vale, Buckinghamshire, England. It was privately built in 1871 by the 3rd Duke of Buckingham as a horse tram line to help transport goods between his lands around Wotton House and the national rail network. Lobbying from the nearby village of Brill led to its extension to Brill and conversion to passenger use in early 1872. Two locomotives were bought, but trains still travelled at an average speed of 4 miles per hour (6 km/h).

== History ==
In 1883, the Duke of Buckingham planned to upgrade the route to main line standards and extend the line to Oxford, creating the shortest route between Aylesbury and Oxford. Despite the backing of the wealthy Ferdinand de Rothschild, investors were deterred by costly tunnelling. In 1888, a cheaper scheme was proposed in which the line would be built to a lower standard and avoid tunnelling, and, in anticipation, the line was named the Oxford & Aylesbury Tramroad.

== Upgrade ==
The existing line was upgraded in 1894, but the extension to Oxford was never built. Instead, operation of the Brill Tramway was taken over by London's Metropolitan Railway and Brill became one of its two north-western termini. The line was rebuilt in 1910, and more advanced locomotives were introduced, allowing trains to run faster. The population of the area remained low, and the primary income source remained the carriage of goods to and from farms. Between 1899 and 1910, other lines were built in the area, providing more direct services to London and the north of England. The Brill Tramway went into financial decline.

In 1933, the Metropolitan Railway became the Metropolitan line of London Transport. The Brill Tramway became part of the London Underground, despite Quainton Road being 40 miles (64 km) from London and not underground. London Transport aimed to concentrate on electrification and improvement of passenger services in London and saw little possibility that passenger routes in Buckinghamshire could become viable. In 1935, the Brill Tramway was closed. The infrastructure was dismantled and sold. Little trace remains, other than the former junction station at Quainton Road, now the Buckinghamshire Railway Centre.

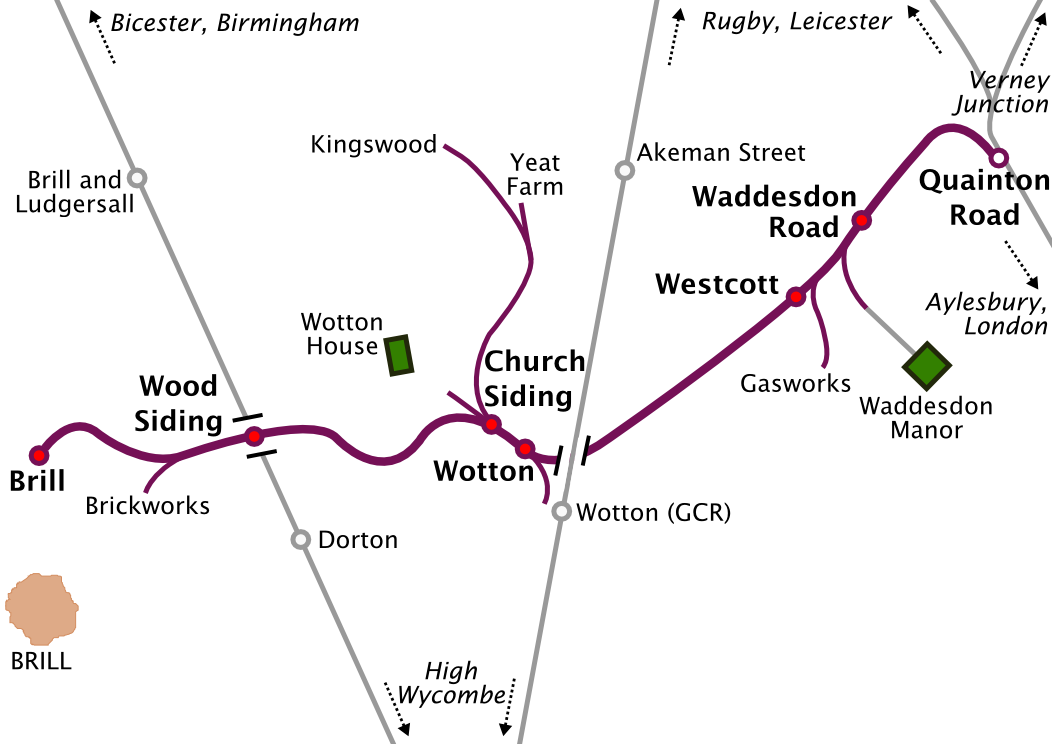
The full extent of the Brill Tramway system. Not all lines and stations shown on this diagram were open at the same time.

== Background ==
Brill is a small village at the top of the 600-foot (180 m) high Brill Hill in the Aylesbury Vale in northern Buckinghamshire, 12 miles (19 km) northeast of Oxford, and 45 miles (72 km) north-west of London. It was the only population centre in Bernwood Forest, a forest owned by English monarchs as a hunting ground. Traditionally believed to have been the home of King Lud, Brill Palace was a seat of the Mercian kings, the home of Edward the Confessor, and an occasional residence of the monarchs of England until at least the reign of Henry III (1216–1272). Brill was a centre for manufacture of pottery and bricks, but it was a long way from major roads or rivers, and separated by hills from Oxford. It remained small and isolated. In the 1861 census it had a population of 1,300.

=== Wotton House and the Dukes of Buckingham ===
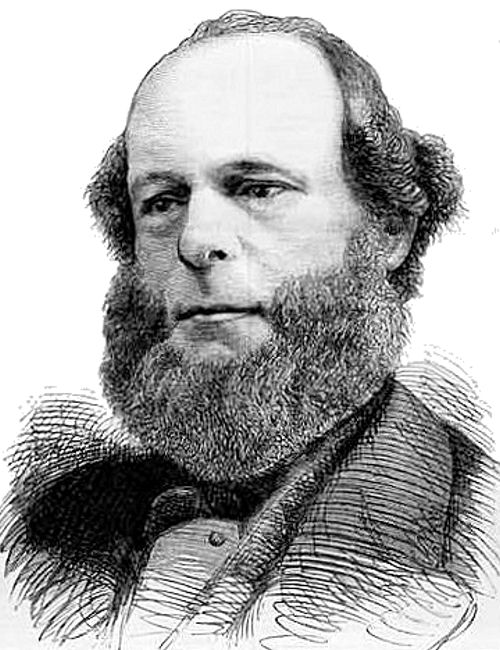
Richard, Marquess of Chandos, later the 3rd Duke of Buckingham and Chandos

Richard Plantagenet Campbell Temple-Nugent-Brydges-Chandos-Grenville, the only son of Richard Plantagenet Temple-Nugent-Brydges-Chandos-Grenville, 2nd Duke of Buckingham and Chandos, was born on 10 September 1823. By the mid-19th century the family was in financial difficulty. (Note: The 2nd Duke had spent heavily on artworks, womanising, and buying property in an effort to influence elections. By 1847 he was nicknamed "the Greatest Debtor in the World"; his debts stood at £1,464,959 11s 11d (about £131 million in 2025). In January 1845 bailiffs attended the family seat of Stowe House during a visit by Queen Victoria. The 2nd Duke persuaded them to dress as his servants during the royal visit, and Victoria remained unaware that repossession was taking place.) The family's estates and their London home at Buckingham House (No. 91 Pall Mall) were sold and the family seat of Stowe House seized by bailiffs as security and its contents sold. Over 40,000 acres (16,200 ha) of the family's 55,000-acre (22,300 ha) estates were sold to meet debts.

The only property in the control of the Grenville family was the small ancestral home of Wotton House and its associated lands around Wotton Underwood near Brill. The Grenvilles looked for ways to maximise profits from their remaining farmland around Wotton, and to seek opportunities in heavy industry and engineering. Richard Plantagenet Campbell Temple-Nugent-Brydges-Chandos-Grenville (titled Marquess of Chandos following the death of his grandfather Richard Temple-Nugent-Brydges-Chandos-Grenville, 1st Duke of Buckingham and Chandos in 1839) was appointed chairman of the London and North Western Railway (LNWR) on 27 May 1857. After the death of his father on 29 July 1861 he became 3rd Duke of Buckingham and Chandos, and resigned from chairmanship of the LNWR, returning to Wotton House to manage the family's estates. His efforts to pay debts incurred by his father earned praise from Prime Minister Benjamin Disraeli, and in 1875 he was appointed Governor of Madras, serving until 1880.

=== Early railways in the Aylesbury Vale ===
On 15 June 1839 entrepreneur and former Member of Parliament for Buckingham, Sir Harry Verney, 2nd Baronet, opened the Aylesbury Railway. Built under the direction of Robert Stephenson, it connected the London and Birmingham Railway's Cheddington railway station on the West Coast Main Line to Aylesbury High Street railway station in eastern Aylesbury, the first station in the Aylesbury Vale. On 1 October 1863 the Wycombe Railway opened a branch from Princes Risborough railway station to Aylesbury railway station on the western side of Aylesbury, leaving Aylesbury as the terminus of two small and unconnected branch lines.

Meanwhile, north of Aylesbury the Buckinghamshire Railway was being built by Sir Harry Verney. The scheme consisted of a line running southwest to northeast from Oxford to Bletchley and a second southeast from Brackley via Buckingham to join the Oxford–Bletchley line halfway along its length. The first section opened on 1 May 1850, and the whole on 20 May 1851. The Buckinghamshire Railway intended to extend the line south to the station at Aylesbury, but the extension was not built.

On 6 August 1860 the Aylesbury and Buckingham Railway, with the 3rd Duke (then still Marquess of Chandos) as chairman and Sir Harry Verney as deputy chairman, was incorporated by Act of Parliament to connect the Buckinghamshire Railway (now operated by the LNWR) to Aylesbury. The 2nd Duke ensured the new route ran via Quainton, near his estates around Wotton, instead of a more direct route via Pitchcott. Beset by financial difficulties, the line took over eight years to build, eventually opening on 23 September 1868. The new line was connected to the Wycombe Railway's Aylesbury station, and joined the Buckinghamshire Railway where the Oxford–Bletchley line and the line to Buckingham met. A junction station was built. With no nearby town after which to name the new station, it was named Verney Junction railway station after Sir Harry. Aylesbury now had railway lines to the east, north and southwest, but no line southeast towards London and the Channel ports.

== Construction and early operations ==
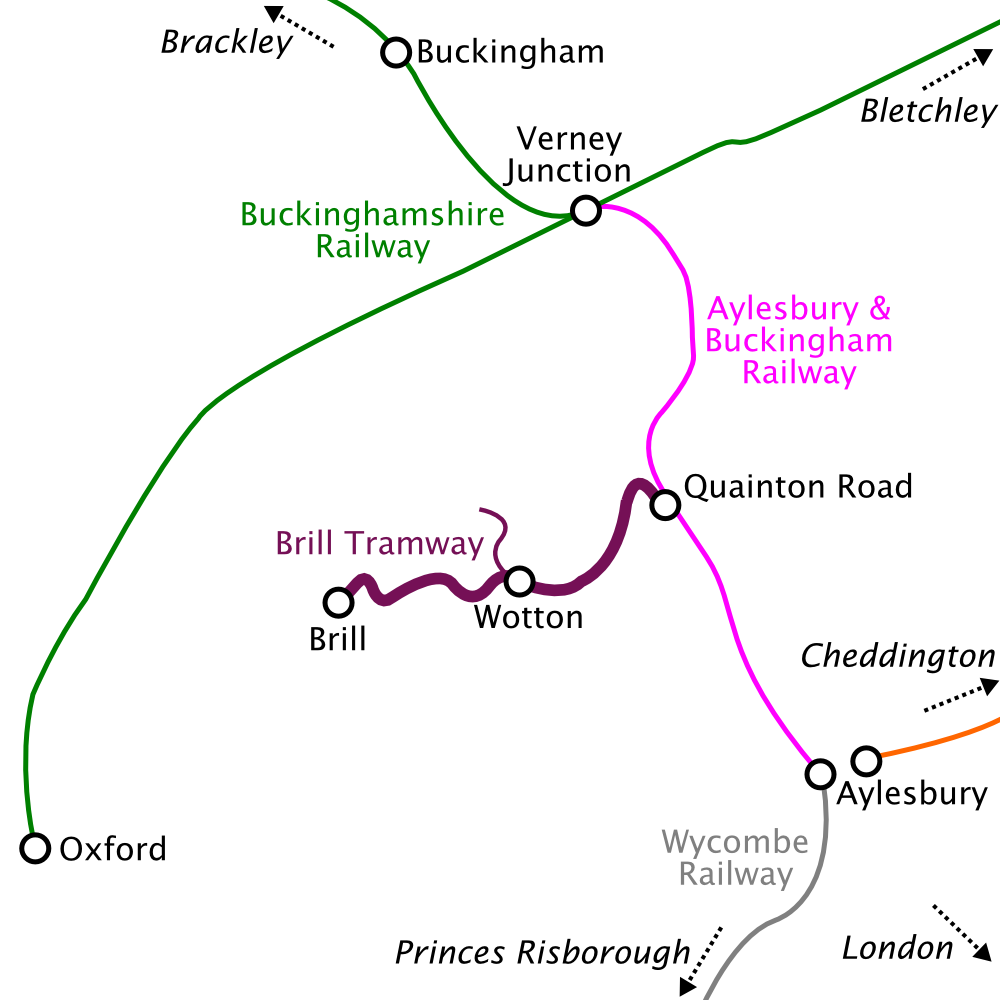
Railways in and around the Aylesbury Vale, 1872. The important town of Aylesbury was served by railways in all directions other than southeast towards London and the Channel ports. (Note: Not to scale. Only significant stations and junctions are marked. Lines running out of Oxford other than those which ran through the Aylesbury Vale are not shown.)

With a railway near the border of Wotton House estate, the 3rd Duke decided to build a small-scale agricultural railway to connect the estate to the railway. His intended route ran on his own land other than a small stretch west of the Aylesbury and Buckingham line. This land was owned by the Winwood Charity Trust, an operator of almshouses in Quainton of which the Duke was a trustee. The Duke agreed to pay an annual rent of £12 (about £1,200 in 2025), in return for permission to run trains. With the consent of the Winwood Charity the route did not require Parliamentary approval, and construction could begin immediately.

The Duke envisaged a tramway west from Quainton Road railway station across his Wotton estate. The line was intended for transport of construction materials and agricultural produce and not for passengers. It would not have a junction with the Aylesbury and Buckingham railway, but would have its own station at Quainton Road at a right angle to the A&B's line. A turntable at the end of the tramway would link to a spur from the A&B's line. The line was to run roughly southwest from Quainton Road to Wotton near Wotton Underwood. Just west of the station at Wotton the line split. One section would run west to Wood Siding near Brill. A short stub called Church Siding would run northwest into Wotton Underwood itself, terminating near the parish church, and a 1 mile 57 chains (2.8 km) siding would run north to a coal siding near Kingswood. The branch to Kingswood was routed to pass a pond, to allow the horses working the line to drink.

Ralph Augustus Jones was appointed Manager of the project, and construction began on 8 September 1870. Twenty labourers from the Wotton estate who would otherwise have been unemployed following harvest were employed six days a week to build the line, each paid 11 s per week. They carried out all the construction except laying the track, which was done by the specialists, Lawford & Houghton. The line was built using the cheapest materials and winding around hills to avoid expensive earthworks. The ballast was a mix of burnt clay and ash. The stations were crude earth banks 6 inches (150 mm) high, held in place by wooden planks. As the Duke intended that the line be worked only by horse-drawn carriages, the line was built with longitudinal sleepers to reduce the risk of horses tripping. A 13-foot (4 m) diameter turntable was installed at Quainton Road to link the tramway to the Aylesbury and Buckingham Railway.

=== Opening ===
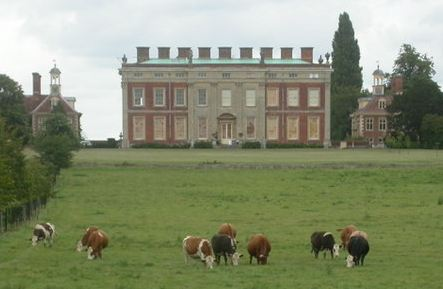
Wotton House, home of the Dukes of Buckingham

On 1 April 1871, the section between Quainton Road and Wotton was formally opened by the Duke of Buckingham in a ceremony in which coal from the first goods wagon to arrive at Wotton was distributed to the poor. (Note: By the time of the formal opening, sections of the line were already in use for transport of construction materials.) At its opening the line was unnamed, but it was referred to as "The Quainton Tramway" in internal correspondence. The extension from Wotton to Wood Siding was complete by 17 June 1871; the opening date of the northern branch to Kingswood is not recorded, but it was not fully open in February 1873. The London and North Western Railway began a dedicated service from Quainton Road, with three vans a week of milk collected from the Wotton estate shipped to the London terminus at Broad Street. The only passengers were estate employees and people accompanying livestock.

The Duke and Jones intended to run no more than one train on each section of the line so the line was not built with passing loops or signalling. When more than one horse-drawn train or locomotive was in operation, the Tramway operated a token system using colour-coded staffs to ensure only one train could be on a section. Drivers between Quainton Road and Wotton carried a blue staff, those west of Wotton and the Kingswood siding a red staff.

On 26 August 1871, an excursion ran from Wood Siding to London hauled by the Great Western Railway (GWR). It carried around 150 people, for a total of 105 1/2 passenger fares (with each child counted as half an adult), and was drawn by horses between Wood Siding and Quainton Road and by locomotive from Quainton Road to Aylesbury where the carriages were attached to the 7.30 am GWR service via Princes Risborough to London, arriving at 10.00 am. The experiment was not a success. Sharp overhanging branches posed a danger to passengers and had to be cut back in the week before the excursion. The day was wet and ticket sales were lower than expected. The return from London to Quainton Road was delayed in Slough, and the excursion arrived back at Wood Siding at 2.00 am.

This wet weather has considerably affected the incline just below the Lodge. The horses' feet sunk in very deep and they have been down once or twice—I do not think your Grace would wish them to pass over it again until something has been done. Some burnt ballast put down would make the footing firmer. On Monday three separate trucks ran off the line on the incline, but the road has since been firmed in.

— Letter from Ralph Jones to the Duke, 26 June 1871

The surveyors designing the line had worked on the assumption that the wagons would have a load on each wheel of 2 1/2 long tons (2.54 t; 2.80 short tons) and had designed the line accordingly. As it turned out, the four-wheeled wagons used had an average weight of 3 1/2 long tons (3.56 t; 3.92 short tons) and each carried 6–7 long tons (6.10–7.11 t; 6.72–7.84 short tons) of goods, meaning this limit was regularly exceeded. The coal wagons used on the line weighed 5 long tons (5.08 t; 5.60 short tons) each and carried 10 long tons (10.16 t; 11.20 short tons) of coal, meaning a load on each wheel of 3 3/4 long tons (3.81 t; 4.20 short tons).

As well as damaging the track the loads strained the horses, and soon the line began to suffer with derailments, particularly in wet weather. On 20 October 1871 Jones wrote to the Duke that "The traffic is now becoming so heavy that I would, most respectfully, venture to ask your Grace to consider the subject as to whether an Engine would not be the least expensive and most efficient power to work it."

=== Extension to Brill and conversion to steam ===
In late 1871, residents of Brill petitioned the Duke to extend the route to Brill and open a passenger service. The Duke agreed; it is likely he had already planned passenger services to Brill, as correspondence from early 1871 mentions passenger facilities at "the Brill terminus". In January 1872 a scheduled passenger timetable was published and the line was named the "Wotton Tramway". (Officially called the "Wotton Tramway", it was commonly known as the "Brill Tramway" from the time of its conversion to passenger use.) The new terminus of Brill railway station, at the foot of Brill Hill approximately 3/4 mile (1.2 km) north of the town, opened in March 1872. It was now a passenger railway, but goods traffic continued to be the primary purpose of the line. The line was heavily used to ship bricks from the brickworks around Brill, and cattle and milk from farms on the Wotton estate. By 1875 the line was carrying around 40,000 imperial gallons (180,000 L; 48,000 US gal) of milk each year. The inbound delivery of linseed cake to the dairy farms and of coal to the area's buildings were also important. The line began to carry manure from London to the area's farms, carrying 3,200 long tons (3,300 t; 3,600 short tons) in 1872. The tramway also opened a cartage business to handle the onward shipment of goods and parcels unloaded at Brill and Wotton stations.

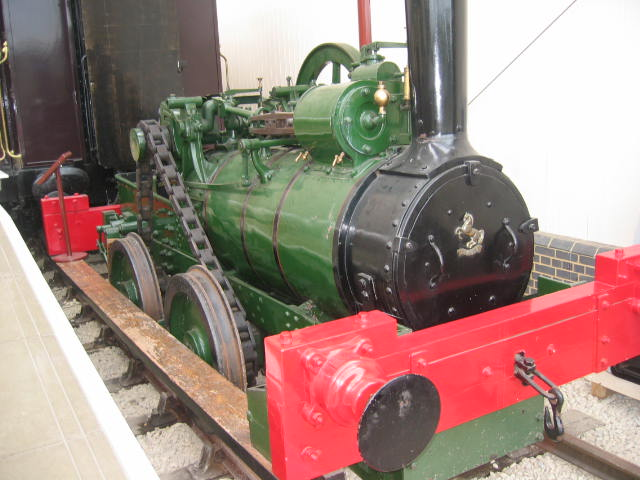
Aveling and Porter number 807 (Wotton Tramway No. 1), nicknamed "Old Chainey", the first locomotive used on the Wotton Tramway

With horses unable to cope, Jones and the Duke decided to convert at least part of the railway for locomotives. The lightly laid track with longitudinal sleepers limited them to 9 long tons (9.14 t; 10.08 short tons), and it was thus necessary to use the lightest locomotives possible. Two traction engines converted for railway use were bought from Aveling and Porter for £398 (about £38,900 in 2025) each. They were chosen for weight and reliability, and had a top speed on the level of 8 miles per hour (13 km/h). They took 95–98 minutes between Brill and Quainton Road, an average of 4 miles per hour (6.4 km/h). With an unusual configuration in which a flywheel drove chains which in turn drove the wheels, the locomotives were noisy and were nicknamed "Old Chainey" by locals.

The first of the new locomotives, given serial number 807 by Aveling and Porter and numbered 1 by the Tramway, was delivered to Wotton station on 27 January 1872. On the day of its delivery, the now-redundant horses had been sent away. Nobody at Wotton could operate the locomotive so a horse had to be hired from Aylesbury until the driver arrived. After the delivery of the second locomotive on 7 September 1872, all passenger services were drawn by locomotive except on Thursdays, when locomotives were replaced by horses to allow for maintenance. The line carried 104 passengers in January 1872, rising to 224 in April, and 456 in August 1872.

With steam came the need for water. Plans to dig a well near Wotton came to nothing, and the Duke's expedient of drawing water from a pond near Quainton Road did not impress the pond's owner. By March 1872 Jones recorded that "The party to whom the pond near the Quainton Station belongs is making complaints about our having water and I expect he will be using force to prevent our getting any". A wooden water tower was built at Brill station, and a large water tower known as the Black Tank was built in the fork of the main line and Church Siding.

One day the engine ran off the line and the driver collected 19 field labourers and odd men and shoved her back onto the lines and she finished the journey with no further mishap.

— Letter to The Times, 6 December 1935

The engines proved adequate but slow. On 6 February 1872, Jones timed one as taking 41 minutes to travel roughly 2 miles (3.2 km) from Quainton Road to Wotton hauling 42 tons (43 t). They were low-powered, and when pulling a heavy load their front wheels would lift off the track. The Duke's cost-cutting led to poor maintenance of track and equipment, and the service was often interrupted by derailments and accidents.

In 1876, the Aylesbury and Buckingham Railway raised its prices for coal haulage. All coal hauled on the Tramway needed to pass along the A&BR from Verney Junction or Aylesbury and Jones had to raise prices to cover the surcharge or keep prices stable despite the loss of profits. Road-hauled coal from Bicester was already undercutting the Tramway and the unreliable engines had given the Tramway a poor reputation. Jones kept prices fixed and absorbed the increased costs, wrecking the Tramway's already declining business.

In 1873, the 3rd Duke attempted to have the Wotton Tramway recognised as a railway, and William Yolland inspected the line in April 1873. The Railway Regulation Act 1844 defined minimum standards of travel, one of which was that the trains travel at an average of 12 miles per hour (19 km/h), which the Aveling and Porter locomotives could not manage. None of the stopping places had adequate station buildings, and the line had no signals. Yolland permitted the line to continue as a tramway, but refused to recognise it as a railway.

== Improvement and diversification ==
An Aveling and Porter locomotive in operation on the Wotton Tramway

By the mid-1870s, the slow locomotives and their unreliability and inability to handle heavy loads were major problems. In 1874 Ferdinand de Rothschild bought a 2,700-acre (1,100 ha) site near Waddesdon station from John Spencer-Churchill, 7th Duke of Marlborough, for his planned Waddesdon Manor. Jones and the Duke recognised that construction would increase the haulage of heavy goods and that the engines would not cope.

Engineer William Gordon Bagnall had established the locomotive firm of W. G. Bagnall in 1875. Bagnall wrote to the Duke offering to hire his first locomotive for trials. On 18 December 1876, the locomotive Buckingham was delivered. It entered service on 1 January 1877, mainly on the steep section of the line between Wotton and Brill. Jones was unhappy with some aspects of Buckingham, but recognised the improvement and ordered a locomotive from Bagnall for £640 (about £64,500 in 2025). Wotton was delivered on 28 December 1877 and Buckingham was returned to Bagnall in February 1878.

Buckingham and Wotton were more reliable than the Aveling and Porter engines. With modern locomotives on the Brill–Quainton Road route (the Kingswood branch generally remained worked by horses, and occasionally by the Aveling and Porter engines), traffic rose. The figure for milk traffic rose from 40,000 gallons carried in 1875 to 58,000 gallons (260,000 L; 70,000 US gal) in 1879, and in 1877 the Tramway carried 20,994 tons (21,331 t) of goods. In early 1877 it appeared on Bradshaw maps and from May 1882 Bradshaw listed the timetable.

A fatal accident of a very sad nature occurred on Thursday evening last on the Wotton Tramway between Brill and Quainton Road. The ladies' maid of Lady Mary Grenville, daughter of the Duke of Buckingham and Chandos, was, it appears, with two other ladies' maids walking along the Tramway, and when near a spot where it is crossed by the highway were overtaken by the engine who sounded his whistle and two of them promptly left the track. Ellen Maria Nicholls [sic] lingered for a moment to look at the train and was knocked down and killed instantaneously. The body was taken to Wotton House.

— Bucks Herald, 10 March 1883

Despite frequent derailments, low speed meant Wotton Tramway had a good safety record. The locomotives occasionally ran over stray sheep, and on 12 September 1888 sparks from one of the Aveling and Porter engines blew back into one of the train's cattle wagons, igniting the straw bedding and badly burning two cows. The line had one serious accident, in which Ellen Maria Nickalls, a servant at Wotton House, was struck by a locomotive near Church Siding and killed. The coroner returned a verdict of accidental death, absolving driver James Challis. (Note: Melton (1984) suggests that Nickalls may have been walking to Wotton House from Wotton station. Church Siding continued to be listed in the timetable until 1894, but had never been rebuilt as a station and remained a crude earth bank; passengers for Wotton House would generally leave the train at Wotton station and walk along the line.)

=== Passenger services ===
Jones increased scheduled passenger journeys from two to three each day in each direction. With locomotives generally occupied with goods, many passenger services were drawn by horse. The increased passenger journeys boosted revenues, but the Tramway no longer owned enough horses and had to hire them. By 1881, the passenger service was losing £11 (about £1,200 in 2025) a month, although reduced use of locomotives lowered maintenance costs. Reliability had improved, but services were still slow. Horse-drawn passenger services took 60–70 minutes to travel 6 miles (9.7 km) between Quainton Road and Brill. The locomotive-hauled mixed trains, with frequent stops to load and unload, were timetabled at 1 1/2 to 2 3/4 hours to make the same journey, slower than walking.

Jones hoped to increase passenger revenue by promoting Brill as a spa. The chalybeate springs of Dorton Spa outside Brill were known for supposed healing powers, and a resort had been built around the Spa in the 1830s, featuring a modern pump house and eight baths, set in 12 acres (4.9 ha) of parkland. Despite the redevelopment and the building of modern hotels in Brill, Dorton Spa was unfashionable and by the late 19th century was little used. Jones and the Spa's owners hoped Queen Victoria would visit during her 1890 stay at Waddesdon Manor and thus boost Brill as a spa town. A visit was arranged, but Victoria changed her mind and visited the spa at Cheltenham instead. The spa traffic never materialised.

=== Waddesdon Manor ===
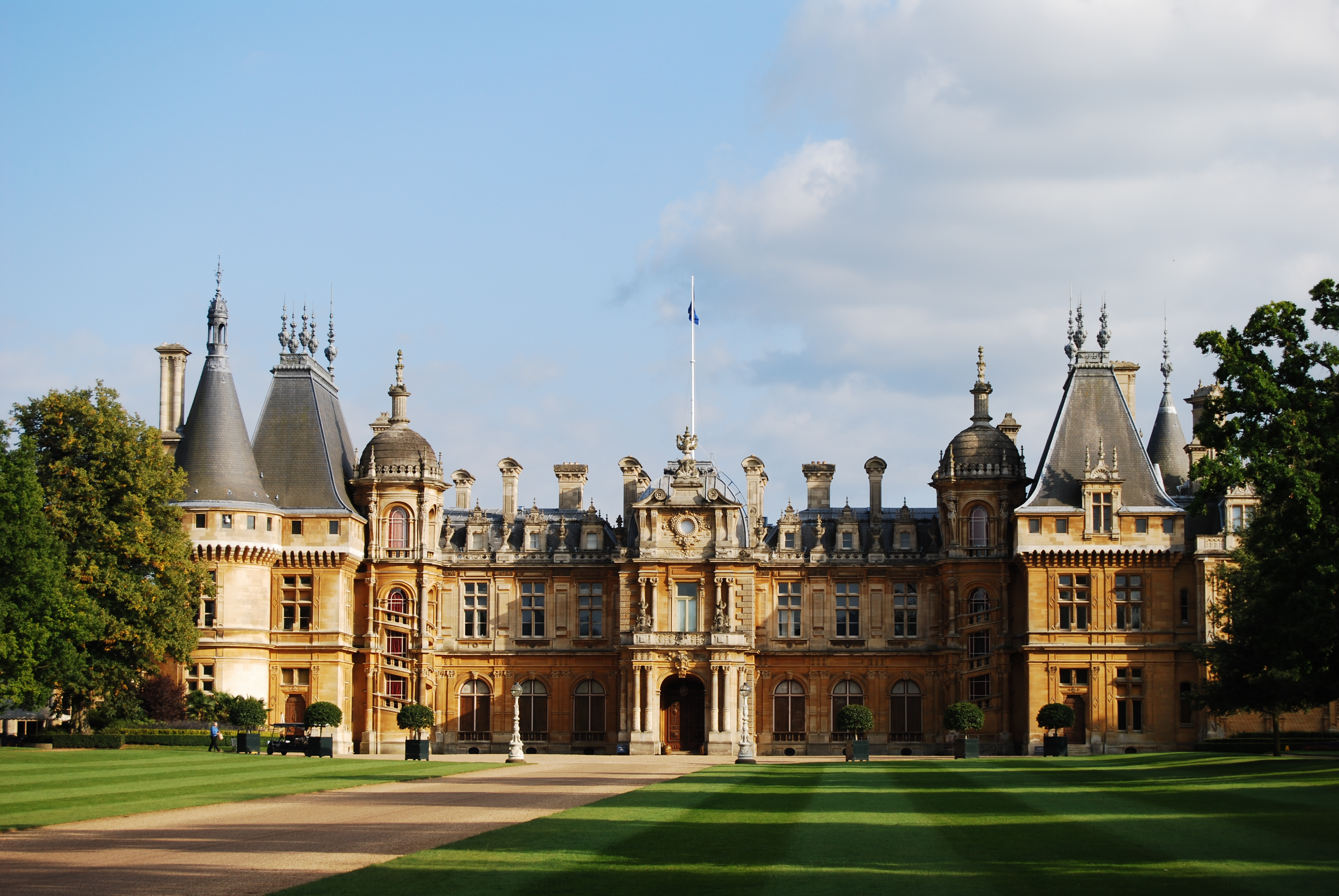
The Tramway was heavily used during the construction of Waddesdon Manor.

In 1876, Ferdinand de Rothschild began work on Waddesdon Manor, a short distance south of the Tramway's station at Waddesdon (later renamed Waddesdon Road). The top of Lodge Hill, a landmark, was levelled to provide a site and sloping drives were cut into the hill to provide access to the construction site. Transport of materials was by horse, but the contractors had to get enormous stone blocks up the hill. Rothschild's contractors built a line, known as the Winchendon Branch, which turned off the Tramway between Waddesdon and Westcott stations and ran south to the foot of Lodge Hill. From there a cable tram ran on narrow gauge rails up the hill to a gully close to the building site. (Note: The gully remains, but no other trace of the branch to Waddesdon Manor has survived.) Materials were hauled along the cable tramway in tubs by a steam-powered winch. The Winchendon Branch was hastily and cheaply built; after one of the Tramway's locomotives derailed there on 5 July 1876, Jones refused to allow his engines on it, and from then on materials were hauled along the branch by horses.

The building of Waddesdon Manor generated huge business for the Tramway. Large numbers of bricks from Poore's Brickworks at Brill were shipped. By July 1877 the entire output of the brickworks was going to supply the Waddesdon Manor works, with 25,000 bricks a week being used. Additional bricks were also shipped via Quainton Road, along with 7,000 tons (7,100 t) of Bath Stone from Corsham. The manor also required power and in 1883 a gasworks was built to the west. A siding from Westcott station ran south to the gasworks, to carry coal. Waddesdon Manor chose not to use the Tramway for supplying coal to the gasworks and the siding was abandoned in 1886.

Waddesdon Manor was complete in 1889, 13 years after construction began. The Winchendon Branch closed and the track was removed. The gasworks remained operational, supplied by road, until its closure during the coal shortage of 1916. It was demolished shortly afterwards. The track of the disused siding remained until at least 1916.

=== Brill Brick and Tile Works ===
Poore's Brickworks was well established, and Jones believed there was potential profit in the Duke of Buckingham's capitalising on his access to a railway line by becoming directly involved in brickmaking. Trials with Brill clay in 1883 proved positive, and in April 1885 Jones sought estimates for machinery and labour necessary to produce 10 million bricks a year. It was decided that 5 million bricks per year was a realistic figure, with bricks to be manufactured in kilns between Brill and Wood Siding stations and shipped down the Tramway to the national network. Progress was slow and obstructed by the local authority.

Few records survive of the Brill Brick and Tile Works, as it came to be called, but it was operational by 1895. Jones (1974) says the siding to the brickworks opened with the extension to Brill, implying that Brill Brick and Tile Works existed in early 1872. This is almost certainly incorrect; no mention of the sidings is made in the Duke of Buckingham's correspondence before 1887 and no reference to the Brill Brick and Tile Works exists in any source earlier than 1895. The bricks used to build Waddesdon Manor had to be shipped by road from Poore's to Brill or along the Aylesbury and Buckingham Railway from further afield before being sent down the Tramway to the site, implying there was no works capable of making high numbers of bricks along the Tramway.

Brill Brick and Tile Works could not compete with the larger and better-connected brickworks at Calvert and declined. (Note: In 1899 the Great Central Railway mainline from London to Manchester was built, running directly past the brickworks at Calvert. It was cheaper and faster for industries of Lancashire and London to buy bricks from Calvert instead of Brill, despite the towns being less than 7 miles (11 km) apart.) The brickworks finally closed in the early 20th century. (Note: Sources disagree on the exact closure date of the Brill Brick and Tile Works; dates given range from 1905 to 1911.) The building was taken over by the W. E. Fenemore workshop, making hay loaders, before being converted into a timber yard in the 1920s.

=== Relations with the Aylesbury and Buckingham Railway ===
Once the train had stopped 1/2 mile (0.80 km) short of the station, and looking out after a long wait I saw the engine far away. Luckily my shouting was heard and the combination guard, porter and stationmaster ran back. In answer to my "What has happened?" he replied "We just forgot we had a passenger."

— Letter to The Times, 6 December 1935

The introduction of the Bagnall locomotives and the traffic generated by the works at Waddesdon Manor had boosted the route's fortunes, but it remained in serious financial difficulty. The only connection with the national railway network was by way of the turntable at Quainton Road. The 3rd Duke of Buckingham chaired the Aylesbury and Buckingham Railway but its management regarded the Tramway as a nuisance. In the 1870s it charged disproportionately high fees for through traffic between the Tramway and the main line with the intention of forcing the Tramway out of business. Relations deteriorated between Jones and J. G. Rowe, Secretary and Traffic Manager of the A&B. The A&B's trains at Quainton Road would miss connections with the Tramway, causing milk shipped to Quainton to become unsellable, to the extent that Jones began unloading milk at Waddesdon and shipping it to Aylesbury by road. Jones asked the Duke to intervene, but relations remained poor; in 1888 Rowe blocked the telegraph along the Tramway, and in one meeting Jones and Rowe threatened violence.

Jones sought legal advice and was told that the Duke would probably win a legal action against the A&BR. The A&BR was in such a precarious financial position that any successful legal action against them would likely have forced the line through Quainton Road to close, severing the Tramway's connection with the national network altogether. Local dairy farmers began to switch to beef and butter, causing a drop in milk transport. From its peak of 20,994 tons carried in 1877, goods traffic fell in each of the next four years, dropping to 9,139 tons (9,286 t) in 1881.

Many of the passengers using the Tramway continued their journey by way of the A&BR line; in 1885, 5,192 passengers changed trains between the A&BR and the Tramway at Quainton Road. Jones suggested that the A&BR subsidise the Tramway's service to the sum of £25 (about £2,800 in 2025) per month to allow passenger services to continue, but the A&BR agreed to pay only £5 (about £600 in 2025) per month. By the mid-1880s the Tramway was finding it difficult to cover the operating expenses of either goods or passenger operations.

== Oxford extension schemes ==
=== Oxford, Aylesbury and Metropolitan Junction Railway Company ===
Oxford, Aylesbury and Metropolitan Junction Railway Act 1883
- Act of Parliament
- Parliament of the United Kingdom
- Long title: An Act to authorise the Construction of a Railway from Oxford to Aylesbury and for other purposes.
- Citation: 46 & 47 Vict. c. ccx

Dates
- Royal assent: 20 August 1883

Text of statute as originally enacted

Euston railway station opened in 1837, the first railway station connecting London with the industrial heartlands of the West Midlands and Lancashire. Railways were banned by a parliamentary commission from operating in London itself and the station was built on the northern boundary. Other termini north of London followed at Paddington (1838), Bishopsgate (1840), Fenchurch Street (1841), King's Cross (1852) and St Pancras (1868). All were outside the built-up area, making them inconvenient. (Note: The ban on stations in London was firmly enforced, with the exception of Victoria station (1858) and the Snow Hill tunnel of the London, Chatham and Dover Railway (1866). The Snow Hill tunnel (now Thameslink) remains the only main line railway to cross London.)

Charles Pearson (1793–1862) had proposed an underground railway connecting the City of London with the main line rail termini in around 1840. In 1854 he commissioned the first traffic survey, determining that each day 200,000 walked into the City, 44,000 travelled by omnibus, and 26,000 in private carriages. A parliamentary commission backed Pearson's proposal over other schemes. Despite concerns about vibration causing subsidence of buildings, the problems of compensating the many thousands whose homes were destroyed during digging of the tunnel, and fears that the tunnelling might break into Hell, (Note: "The forthcoming end of the world would be hastened by the construction of underground railways burrowing into the infernal regions and thereby disturbing the devil."—from a sermon preached by Dr Cuming at Smithfield, much of which would be destroyed by the building of the Metropolitan Railway, c. 1855) construction began in 1860. On 9 January 1863 the line opened as the Metropolitan Railway (MR), the world's first underground passenger railway.

The MR grew steadily, extending its own services and acquiring other local railways north and west of London. In 1872 Edward Watkin (1819–1901) was appointed Chairman. A director of many railway companies, he wanted to unify a string of companies to create a single line from Manchester via London to an intended Channel Tunnel and on to France. In 1873 Watkin negotiated to take control of the Aylesbury and Buckingham Railway and the section of the former Buckinghamshire Railway north from Verney Junction to Buckingham. He planned to extend the MR north from London to Aylesbury and extend the Tramway southwest to Oxford, creating a route from London to Oxford. Rail services between Oxford and London were poor, and the scheme would have formed the shortest route from London to Oxford, Aylesbury, Buckingham and Stratford-upon-Avon. The Duke of Buckingham was enthusiastic and authorisation was sought from Parliament, who rejected the Buckinghamshire and Northamptonshire Union Railway Bill in 1875. Watkin received consent in 1881 to extend the MR to Aylesbury.

With extension to Aylesbury approved, the Duke of Buckingham in March 1883 announced his own scheme to extend the Brill Tramway to Oxford. The turntable at Quainton Road would be replaced with a junction to the south of the existing turntable to allow through running. The stretch from Quainton Road to Brill would be straightened and improved to main line standards, and Waddesdon Road and Wood Siding stations would close. From Brill, the line would pass in a 1,650-yard (1,510 m) tunnel through Muswell Hill to the south of Brill, and on via Boarstall before crossing from Buckinghamshire into Oxfordshire at Stanton St. John. From Stanton St. John the line would stop on the outskirts of Oxford at Headington, terminating at a station to be built in the back garden of 12 High Street, St Clement's, near Magdalen Bridge. The proposal included a separate set of rails to be provided where the old and new routes ran together, to allow the existing Wotton Tramway to continue to operate independently if it saw fit, but given the Duke's involvement in the new scheme it is unlikely he intended to use this option.

At 23 miles (37 km) the line would have been the shortest route between Oxford and Aylesbury, compared with 28 miles (45 km) via the GWR (which had absorbed the Wycombe Railway), and 34 miles (55 km) via the Aylesbury and Buckingham Railway and the LNWR. The act authorising the scheme, the Oxford, Aylesbury and Metropolitan Junction Railway Act 1883 (46 & 47 Vict. c. ccx), received royal assent on 20 August 1883, and the new Oxford, Aylesbury and Metropolitan Junction Railway Company was created, including the Duke of Buckingham, Ferdinand de Rothschild and Harry Verney among its directors. The scheme caught the attention of the expansionist Metropolitan Railway, who paid for the survey. Despite these powerful backers, the expensive Muswell Hill tunnel deterred investors. De Rothschild promised to lend money in return for guarantees that the rebuilt line would include a passenger station at Westcott, and that the Duke would press the Aylesbury and Buckingham Railway to open a station at the nearest point to Waddesdon Manor. Waddesdon Manor railway station opened on 1 January 1897.

=== Oxford & Aylesbury Tramroad ===
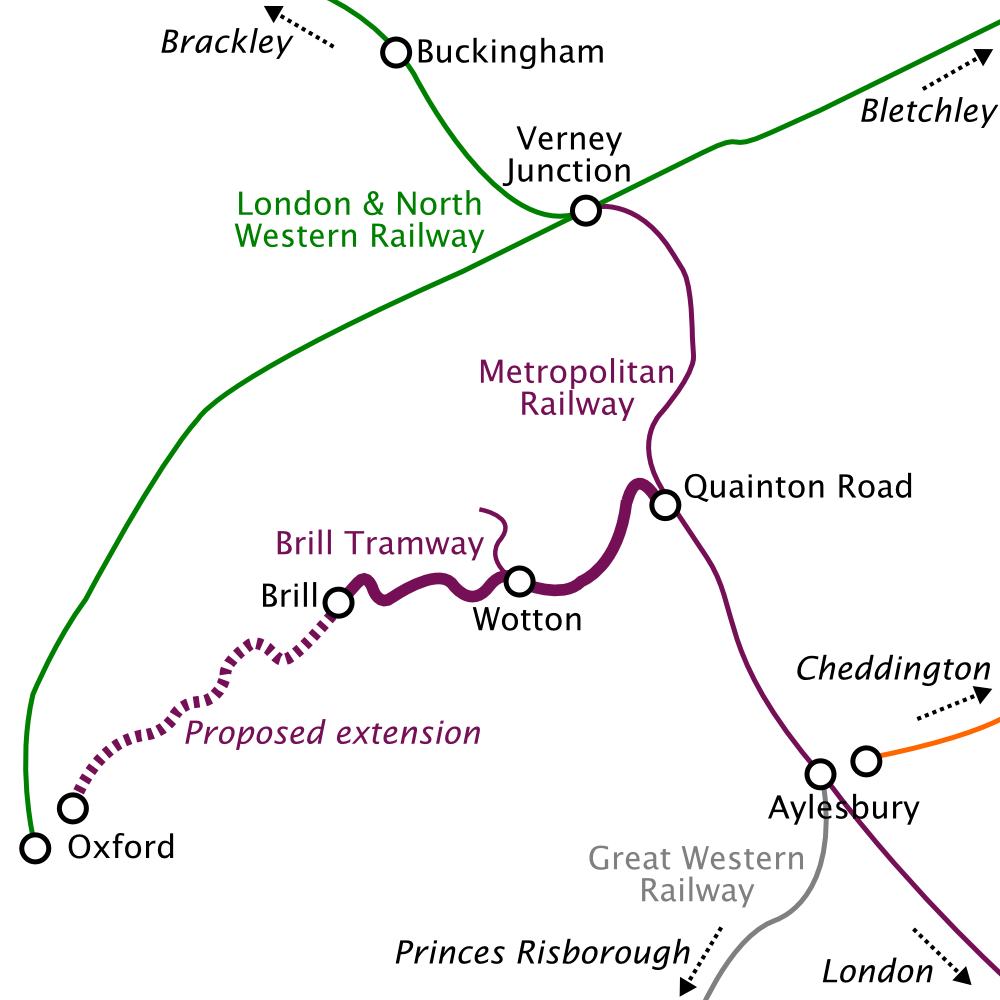
Railways in and around the Aylesbury Vale, 1894. The proposed new route from Aylesbury to Oxford via Brill was significantly shorter than the existing route via Verney Junction.

Oxford and Aylesbury Tramroad Act 1888
- Act of Parliament
- Parliament of the United Kingdom
- Long title: An Act to authorise the abandonment of the Railway authorised by the Oxford Aylesbury and Metropolitan Junction Railway Act 1883 and the construction of a Tramroad instead thereof.
- Citation: 51 & 52 Vict. c. clxxxv

Dates
- Royal assent: 7 August 1888

Text of statute as originally enacted

Despite cash from Rothschild, the company could not raise sufficient investment to begin construction of the Oxford extension, and had only been given a five-year window by Parliament in which to build it. On 7 August 1888, less than two weeks before the authorisation was to expire, the directors of the Oxford, Aylesbury and Metropolitan Junction Railway Company received royal assent for a revised and cheaper version in the Oxford and Aylesbury Tramroad Act 1888 (51 & 52 Vict. c. clxxxv). To be called the Oxford & Aylesbury Tramroad (O&AT), the new scheme envisaged the extension's being built to the same light specifications as the existing tramway. To avoid expensive earthworks and tunnelling, the line would parallel a road out of Brill, despite the considerable gradients involved. The entire route would be single track, other than passing places, and the Oxford terminus was to be in George Street, nearer the edge of the city. Jones was sceptical and felt that it was unlikely to recoup its construction costs.

On 26 March 1889, the 3rd Duke of Buckingham and Chandos died, aged 65. A special train brought his body from London to Quainton Road, and from Quainton it was taken to Stowe for the service, and on to the family vault at Wotton. Five carriages provided by the London and North Western Railway carried mourners to Church Siding, near Wotton Underwood's church. Another carried a company of the Royal Buckinghamshire Yeomanry, associated with the Grenville family and the upkeep of which had helped bankrupt the second duke. (This second train was delayed on the Aylesbury and Buckingham Railway, arriving late to the burial.)

The dukedom was inherited only in the male line. As the 3rd Duke had three daughters but no son, the title became extinct. The 1st Duke was also Earl Temple of Stowe, a title which descended through heirs of his relatives should the male line become extinct. Consequently, on the 3rd Duke's death this title, with most of the Wotton estate, passed to his nephew William Temple-Gore-Langton who became the 4th Earl Temple. (Note: Wotton House and the bulk of the estate passed to William Temple-Gore-Langton on the death of the 3rd Duke, but some parts of the Tramway, including the cottages at Westcott and Brill, were inherited by the 3rd Duke's daughter Mary Morgan-Grenville, 11th Lady Kinloss. William Temple-Gore-Langton's heir, Algernon William Stephen Temple-Gore-Langton, 5th Earl Temple of Stowe, bought these properties from her in 1903.)

By this time construction of the MR extension from London to Aylesbury was under way, and on 1 July 1891 the MR absorbed the Aylesbury and Buckingham Railway. Sir Harry Verney died on 12 February 1894, and on 31 March 1894 the MR took over services on the A&BR from the GWR. On 1 July 1894 the MR extension to Aylesbury was completed, giving the MR a unified route from London to Verney Junction. The MR embarked on upgrading and rebuilding stations along the line.

Oxford and Aylesbury Tramroad Act 1892
- Act of Parliament
- Parliament of the United Kingdom
- Long title: An Act to revive the powers and extend the time for the compulsory purchase of Lands for and for the completion of the Tramroad and Works authorised by the Oxford and Aylesbury Tramroad Act 1888.
- Citation: 55 & 56 Vict. c. cxxxvii

Dates
- Royal assent: 27 June 1892

Oxford and Aylesbury Tramroad Act 1894
- Act of Parliament
- Parliament of the United Kingdom
- Long title: An Act to empower the Oxford and Aylesbury Tramroad Company to deviate part of the tramroad authorised by the Oxford and Aylesbury Tramroad Act 1888 as amended by the Oxford and Aylesbury Tramroad Act 1892 to revive the powers and extend the time for the Purchase of Lands for and for the completion of the remainder of the said Tramroad authorised by the said Acts and for other purposes.
- Citation: 57 & 58 Vict. c. clxxix

Dates
- Royal assent: 17 August 1894

Text of statute as originally enacted

Construction of the route from Brill to Oxford had not begun. Further acts of Parliament were granted, the Oxford and Aylesbury Tramroad Act 1892 (55 & 56 Vict. c. cxxxvii) and the Oxford and Aylesbury Tramroad Act 1894 (57 & 58 Vict. c. clxxix), varying the route slightly and allowing electrification, but no building was carried out other than surveying. On 1 April 1894, the proposed extension to Oxford still intended, the O&AT exercised a clause of the 1888 act and took over the Wotton Tramway. Jones was retained as general Manager and work began on upgrading the line for the extension.

==== Rebuilding and re-equipping by the O&AT ====
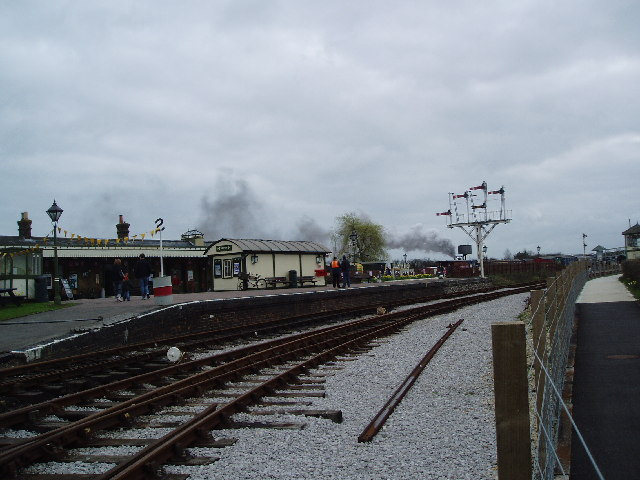
The Brill platform of the second Quainton Road station, sited on the curve between the O&AT and MR lines. The short stretch of rail at the platform is the only surviving part of the route.

The track from Quainton Road to Brill was relaid with improved rails on standard transverse sleepers. The former longitudinal sleepers were used as fence posts and guard rails. The stations, little more than earth banks, were replaced with wooden platforms. Waddesdon, Westcott, Wotton and Brill were fitted with buildings housing a booking office, waiting rooms and toilets, and Wood Siding station had a small waiting room "with shelf and drawer". Church Siding was not included and was removed from the timetable.

The Kingswood branch was not included in the rebuilding, and retained its original 1871 track. Two Manning Wardle locomotives, Huddersfield and Earl Temple, came into use on the line at around this time. (Note: The date of introduction of the Manning Wardle locomotives is not recorded but they were in use by 19 September 1894.) Huddersfield had been built in 1876 and originally named Prestwich; Earl Temple was identical to Huddersfield other than having a covered cab. The Oxford & Aylesbury Tramroad could not afford the price when Earl Temple was delivered and the Earl bought it with his own money and rented it to the O&AT. In 1895 two new passenger carriages, each accommodating 40 passengers, were bought from the Bristol Wagon and Carriage Company. In 1896 Huddersfield was withdrawn, and in 1899 replaced with a new Manning Wardle locomotive named Wotton No. 2, at which time Earl Temple was renamed Brill No. 1.

The rebuilding reduced journeys between Quainton Road and Brill to between 35 and 43 minutes. From 1895 the Tramway ran four passenger services in each direction on weekdays. (Note: In May 1897 passenger journeys were increased to five per day in each direction. The experiment was abandoned after a month and the service reverted to four journeys per day.) The population of the area remained low, and in 1901 Brill had a population of only 1206. Passenger traffic remained insignificant and in 1898 passenger receipts were only £24 per month (about £2,700 in 2025).

Meanwhile, the MR were rebuilding and resiting Quainton Road station, freeing space for a direct link between the former Aylesbury and Buckingham Railway and the O&AT to be built. A curve between the lines opened on 1 January 1897, allowing through running between the two lines.

With through running between the lines in place, in June 1899 the MR inspected the O&AT's carriages and locomotives, and had serious concerns. The original passenger carriage began as a horse tram and was shabby internally, and unsafe as part of a longer train. The passenger carriage from the 1870s was in a poor condition. The 1895 Bristol passenger carriages were unfit because of their light construction. Eight of the O&AT's nine goods wagons did not comply with Railway Clearing House standards and could not be used on other lines. On 4 October 1899 the MR loaned the O&AT an eight-wheeled 70 seat passenger carriage. As this had been built for the MR's standard height platforms rather than the O&AT's low platforms, 80–100 ft (24–30 m) of each platform on the Tramway was raised to standard height to accommodate the MR carriage.

== Metropolitan Railway takeover ==
The Metropolitan Railway in 1903 following absorption of the A&BR and O&AT. The map is skewed about 45° from north; the MR's Buckinghamshire line ran northwest from the Inner Circle (the present day Circle line) in London (bottom). At the northwest (top) end, the MR forks at Quainton Road towards Brill (left) and Verney Junction (right).

The Metropolitan and the Oxford & Aylesbury Tramroad Company were cooperating closely by 1899. The line had been upgraded in preparation for the Oxford extension and had been authorised as a railway in 1894, but construction on the extension had yet to begin. On 27 November John Bell, Watkin's successor as Chairman of the MR, leased the line from the O&AT for £600 (about £67,000 in 2025) a year with an option to buy the line. From 1 December 1899, the MR took over all operations. Jones stayed as Manager. The O&AT's decrepit passenger coach, a relic of Wotton Tramway days, was removed from its wheels and used as a platelayer's hut at Brill station. An elderly Brown, Marshalls and Co passenger coach replaced it, and a section of each platform was raised to accommodate the higher doors of this coach using earth and old railway sleepers.

On 28 March 1902, the 4th Earl Temple died aged 55, succeeded by Algernon William Stephen Temple-Gore-Langton, 5th Earl Temple of Stowe. The Oxford & Aylesbury Tramroad Company, which by now did nothing except collect £600 annual rent from the MR, pay the Winwood Charity Trust rent for their land near Quainton Road crossed by the rails, (Note: Earl Temple reached agreement with the Winwood Charity Trust to buy the small stretch of land at Quainton Road over which the line ran, but the Charity Commission refused to sanction the deal.) and pay Earl Temple an annual dividend of £400, remained independent under the control of the 4th Earl's trustees.

=== Rebuilding and re-equipping by the Metropolitan Railway ===
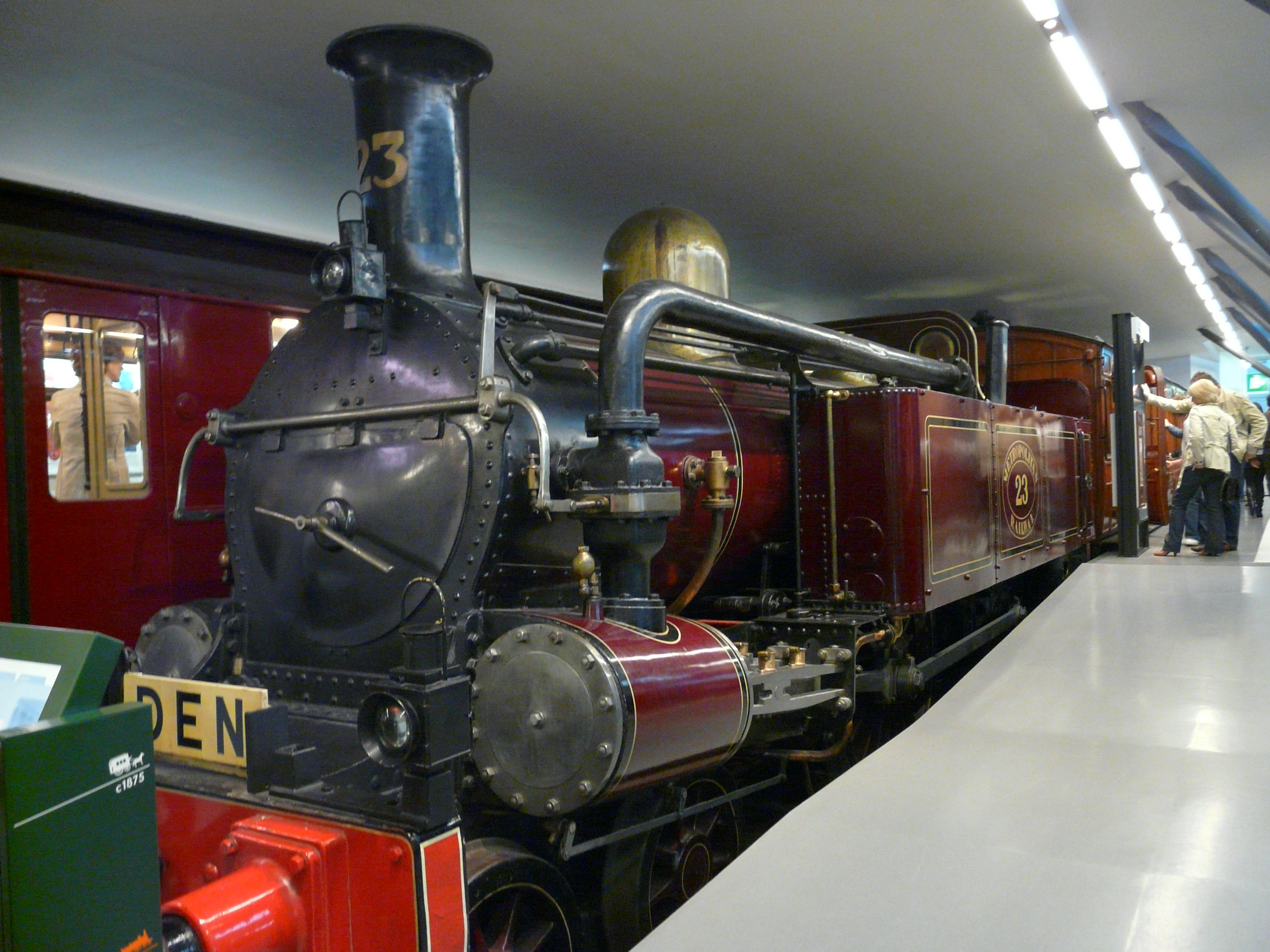
MR No. 23, one of the two A Class locomotives that were used on the Brill branch until its closure

The MR sold all but one of the dilapidated goods wagons to the Llanelly and Mynydd Mawr Railway, replacing them with five eight-wheeled carriages built in 1865–66. The MR considered the Manning Wardle locomotives unreliable and from early 1903 they were replaced by a pair of Metropolitan Railway D Class engines; they were sold in 1911. The heavy D Class locomotives damaged the track, and in 1910 the track between Quainton Road and Brill was relaid to MR standards, using track removed from the inner London MR route but considered adequate for a rural branch line. Following this upgrading, the speed limit was increased to 25 miles per hour (40 km/h).

The Kingswood branch was again not upgraded, (Note: Jones (1974) states that the Kingswood Branch was upgraded during the 1894 rebuilding, but this is unlikely. A 1935 photograph shows the longitudinal track still in place, and in 1969 a piece of track dating from the 1870s was found in situ immediately north of the junction at Church Siding.) and still retained its 1871 track. It was abandoned at the end of 1915, and the track removed in 1920. In 1911 Brill Brick and Tile Works closed, and the siding to the brickworks was removed, with the exception of the rails on the level crossing which in 1984 were still in place, albeit tarmacked over. On the outbreak of the First World War in 1914, Brill became a centre for training cadets, who were housed in Wotton House and ferried in trains of five passenger coaches.

The Metropolitan Railway was unhappy with the performance and safety of the D Class locomotives and sold them between 1916 and 1922. With much of their route close to London now electrified the MR had surplus steam locomotives, and two Metropolitan Railway A Class locomotives, numbers 23 (built 1866) and 41 (built 1869), were transferred to the route. Built by Beyer, Peacock and Company from 1864, the A Class had been the first locomotives owned by the Metropolitan (in 1863, the first year of operation, the MR had used engines borrowed from the GWR). The A Class were the most advanced locomotives regularly to work the route, but they predated all other rolling stock on the Tramway. (Note: Details of the passenger carriage loaned by the Duke when the Wotton Tramway first opened are not known, and it may have predated the A Class locomotives.) The two locomotives operated for a week at a time. Occasionally, the MR substituted other similar locomotives.

Four services per day operated, taking around 40 minutes from one end to the other in 1900, falling to 32 minutes by 1931 after the upgrading of the route and the introduction of the A Class locomotives.

On 1 February 1903 Jones retired and control was taken over directly by the Metropolitan Railway. (Note: Ralph Jones continued to be Secretary of the Oxford & Aylesbury Tramroad Company for seven months after his retirement, resigning the post on 7 August 1903.) Jones died on 14 April 1909, surviving to see the railway network in the Aylesbury Vale reach its greatest extent.

== New railways through the Aylesbury Vale, 1899–1910 ==
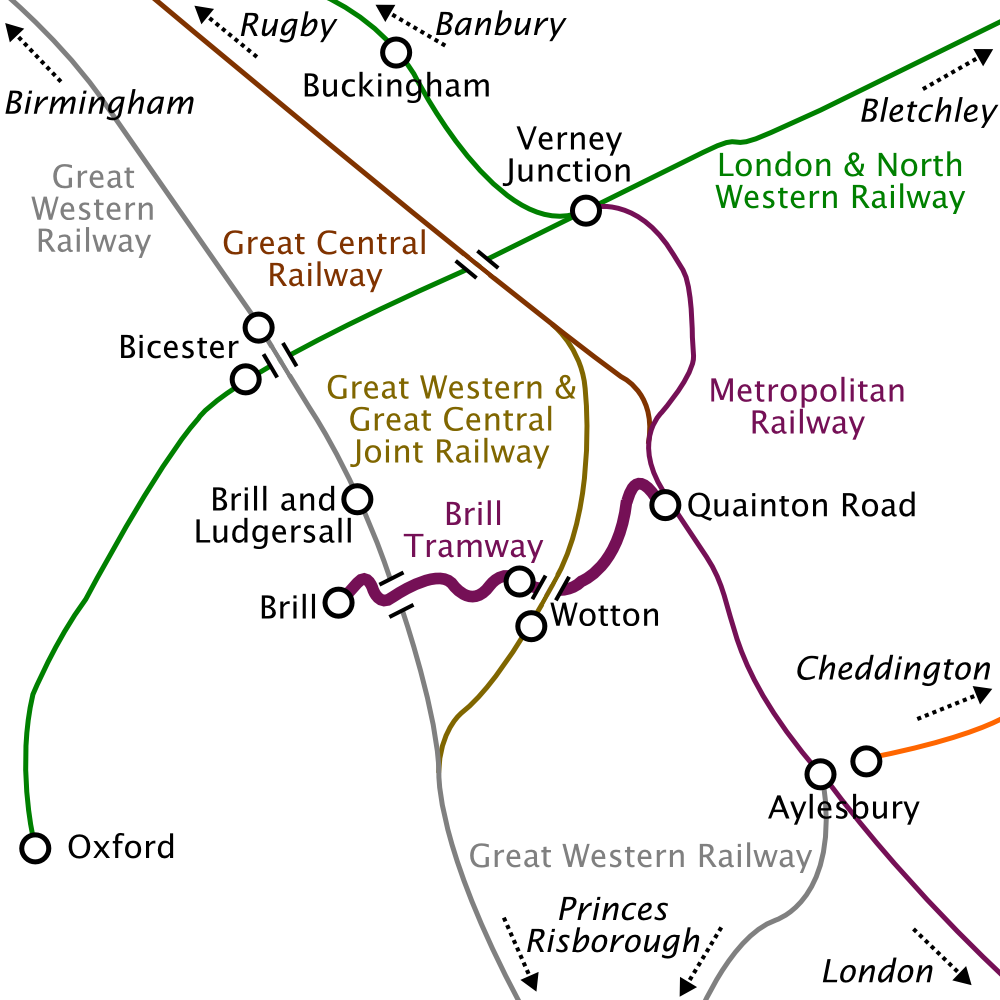
Railways in and around the Aylesbury Vale, 1910–35. Two of the new routes crossed the Tramway, but neither was connected to it. The Tramway's only significant passenger markets at Brill and Wotton were both served by stations on the new lines.

=== Great Central Railway ===
In 1893, another of Edward Watkin's railways, the Manchester, Sheffield and Lincolnshire Railway, had been authorised to build a new 90 miles (140 km) line, from its existing station at Annesley in Nottinghamshire, south to Quainton Road. Watkin had intended to run services from Manchester and Sheffield via Quainton Road and along the Metropolitan Railway to the MR's station at Baker Street. Following Watkin's retirement in 1894, the Manchester, Sheffield and Lincolnshire Railway obtained permission for a separate station near Baker Street at Marylebone, and the line was renamed the Great Central Railway (GCR). The new line joined the existing MR just north of Quainton Road on the Verney Junction branch, and opened to passengers on 15 March 1899. Many of the bricks used in the building of the Great Central Railway were supplied by the Brill Brick and Tile Works and shipped along the Tramway, providing a significant revenue boost to the O&AT.

=== Great Western and Great Central Joint Railway ===
Following Watkin's retirement, relations between the Great Central Railway and the Metropolitan Railway deteriorated badly. The GCR route to London ran over MR lines from Quainton Road to London, and to reduce reliance on the shaky goodwill of the MR, GCR General Manager William Pollitt decided to create a link with the Great Western Railway to create a second route into London. In 1899 the Great Western and Great Central Joint Railway began construction of a new line, commonly known as the Alternative Route, to link the GWR's existing station at Princes Risborough to the new Great Central line. The line ran from Princes Risborough north to meet the Great Central at Grendon Underwood, about 3 miles (4.8 km) north of Quainton Road. The new line was to cross the Tramway on a bridge immediately east of Wotton station; no intersection was built between the lines. A temporary siding was built from the Tramway onto the embankment of the new line, and was used for the transport of construction materials and the removal of spoil from the works during the building of the new line. The line was formally an independent company, but in practice was operated as part of the Great Central Railway.

The new line was planned as a through route and was not intended to have any stations of its own, but in 1904 it was decided to build two stations on it. A new station, also named Wotton, was built immediately to the south of the existing Wotton station. On 2 April 1906 the new route opened to passengers. The two Wotton stations were very close together, and the same stationmaster was responsible for both.

=== Chiltern Main Line Bicester cut-off ===
In 1910, the new Bicester cut-off line of the GWR Chiltern Main Line opened, allowing trains from London to Birmingham to bypass a long curve through Oxford. The new line was routed directly through Wood Siding, but no interchange station was built. The GWR ran in a cutting beneath the existing station; Wood Siding station and its siding were rebuilt at the GWR's expense between 1908 and 1910 to stand on a wide bridge above the GWR's line. The new line included the station named Brill and Ludgershall, which was considerably further from Brill than the existing Brill station.

With the opening of the new routes, the Tramway for the first time suffered serious competition. Although further from Brill than the Tramway's station, the GWR's station provided a fast and direct route to the GWR's London terminus at Paddington. The Great Central Railway's station at Wotton, and the other Great Western and Great Central Joint Railway station at Akeman Street, provided fast and direct routes to both Paddington and to the Great Central's new London terminus at Marylebone, without the need to change trains at Quainton Road. In addition, following the end of the First World War motorised road transport grew rapidly, drawing passenger and goods traffic away from the railways. The Oxford & Aylesbury Tramroad Company repeatedly tried to persuade the Metropolitan Railway to buy the line outright, but the MR declined. In July 1923 the O&AT tried to sell the line to the GWR and to the Electric and Railway Finance Corporation, but was rebuffed by both.

== London Transport ==
The train services provided on the Brill branch of the Met. & GC Joint Line have resulted in a loss of roundly £4,000 per annum. The traffic was exceedingly light; the total number of passenger journeys in the year being 18,000, or fewer than 50 a day. The annual goods and mineral traffic amounted to some 7,600 tons only, representing about 20 tons per day. There has been no development in the traffic, and as, owing to its volume, it seemed quite feasible for it to be dealt with by means of road conveyance, the Board and the LNER jointly took steps to give notice for the closing of this branch line.

— LPTB Annual Report, 1935–36

On 1 July 1933, the Metropolitan Railway, along with London's other underground railways, aside from the short Waterloo & City Railway, was taken into public ownership as part of the newly formed London Passenger Transport Board (LPTB). Thus, despite Brill and Verney Junction being 50 miles (80 km) and over two hours' travel from the City of London, the Oxford & Aylesbury Tramroad and the former Aylesbury and Buckingham Railway became parts of the London Underground network. (Note: Although a part of the London Underground, the stations north of Aylesbury were never shown on the tube map. Wotton was shown as an interchange between the mainline and the Underground on maps published by the London and North Eastern Railway, which had taken over the Great Central Railway in 1923. The only official London Underground map to show the Brill branch as an Underground line, was a diagram displayed in Metropolitan line cars.) The locomotives and carriages were repainted with London Transport's Johnston Sans emblem.

By this time, the route from Quainton Road to Brill was in severe decline. Competition from the newer lines and from improving road haulage had drawn away much of the tramway's custom, and the trains would often run without a single passenger. The A Class locomotives were now 70 years old, and the track itself was poorly maintained. Trains, once again, were regularly derailing on the line.

Frank Pick, managing director of the Underground Group from 1928 and the Chief Executive of the LPTB, aimed to move the network away from freight services, and to concentrate on the electrification and improvement of the core routes in London. He saw the lines beyond Aylesbury via Quainton Road to Brill and Verney Junction as having little future as financially viable passenger routes, concluding that at least £2,000 (about £120,000 in 2025) per year would be saved by closing the Brill branch.

On 1 June 1935, the London Passenger Transport Board gave the required six months notice to the Oxford & Aylesbury Tramroad Company that it intended to terminate operations on the tramway.

=== Closure ===
On Saturday night, for the last time, an antiquated little tank engine drew an equally antiquated passenger coach along the seven-mile railway line between the Bucks villages of Quainton Road and Brill. The train contained officials of the Metropolitan Railway Company, including an assistant superintendent. It stopped at each of the five stations on the line. Documents, records, and all valuables from each station were placed in the guard's van and then the station lights were put out and the train steamed along to its destination at Quainton Road. Soon the engine and coach will be on their way to Neasden and the scrap heap.

— The Times, 2 December 1935

To fulfil their obligations, London Transport formally inspected the line on 23 July 1935. The inspection was carried out with great speed, the special train taking just 15 minutes to travel the length of the line from Brill to Quainton Road. The inspection confirmed that the closure process was to proceed.

The last scheduled passenger service left Quainton Road in the afternoon of 30 November 1935. Hundreds of people gathered, and a number of members of the Oxford University Railway Society travelled from Oxford in an effort to buy the last ticket. Accompanied by firecrackers and fog signals, the train ran the length of the line to Brill, where the passengers posed for a photograph.

Waddesdon Road station (formerly Waddesdon) during its brief time as a London Underground station. After the 1894 rebuilding, four of the six stations were of similar design. Each station's single platform had a raised section, built in 1898 to serve Metropolitan Railway passenger cars. The relaying of the track had replaced the longitudinal design with transverse sleepers. The railway had not stimulated growth in the area, and after over 60 years the stations remained isolated buildings surrounded by farmland.

Late that evening, a two-coach staff train pulled out of Brill, accompanied by a band playing Auld Lang Syne and a white flag. The train stopped at each station along the route, picking up the staff, documents and valuables from each. At 11.45 pm the train arrived at Quainton Road, greeted by hundreds of locals and railway enthusiasts. At the stroke of midnight, the rails connecting the tramway to the Metropolitan Railway main line were ceremonially severed. (Note: Services were withdrawn completely from the Brill branch, but the LPTB used the Verney Junction branch as a freight line and diversionary route, and continued to maintain the line and to operate freight services until 6 September 1947.)

Following the withdrawal of London Transport services the Metropolitan Railway's lease was voided and at midnight on 1 December 1935 the railway and stations reverted to the control of the Oxford & Aylesbury Tramroad Company. The O&AT Board by now had only three members: the 5th Earl Temple, the Earl's agent Robert White, and the former Brill hay-loader manufacturer W. E. Fenemore.

At the time of the closure there was some speculation that the O&AT would continue to operate the tramway as a mineral railway, but with no funds and no rolling stock of its own, the O&AT was unable to operate the line. On 2 April 1936, the entire infrastructure of the stations was sold piecemeal at auction. Excluding the houses at Westcott and Brill, which were sold separately, the auction raised £72 7s (about £4,420 in 2025) in total. (Note: Horne (2003) gives a higher figure of £112 10s for the total raised by the 1936 auction, excluding the houses at Westcott and Brill, and Jones (1974) gives a figure of £200 raised, excluding the houses.) The Ward Scrap Metal Company paid £7,000 (about £428,000 in 2025) for the rails, with the exception of those at Quainton Road which were retained as a siding.

With the stations at Wood Siding and Brill closed, and the GWR's Brill and Ludgershall railway station inconveniently sited, the GWR opened a new station on the Chiltern Main Line near to Brill at Dorton Halt on 21 June 1937.

On 5 January 1937, the board of the Oxford & Aylesbury Tramroad met for the last time. On 5 February 1937 a winding up petition was presented to the High Court, and on 24 March 1937 Mr W. E. Fisher was appointed liquidator. On 11 November 1940 Fisher was formally discharged, and the O&AT officially ceased to exist.

== After closure ==
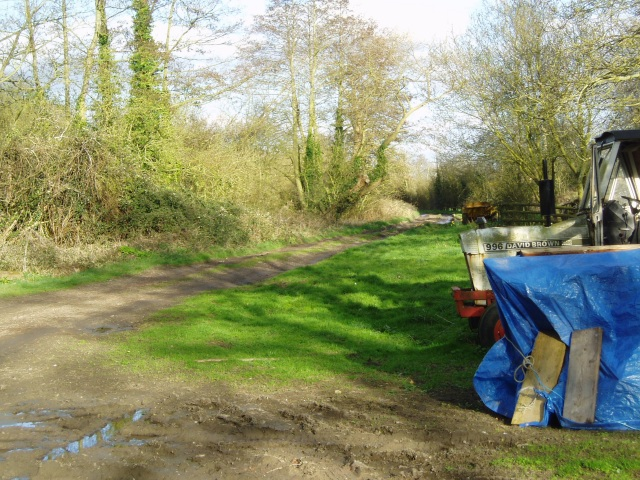
The site of Wotton station in 2005

After closure, the line was largely forgotten. Because it had been built on private land without an Act of Parliament, few records of it prior to the Oxford extension schemes exist in official archives. At least some of the rails remained in place in 1940, as records exist of their removal during the building of RAF Westcott. Other than the station buildings at Westcott and Quainton Road almost nothing survives of the tramway; much of the route can still be traced by a double line of hedges. The former trackbed between Quainton Road and Waddesdon Road is now a public footpath known as the Tramway Walk.

After the death of the 3rd Duke of Buckingham the family archives, including the records of the Brill Tramway, were sold to the Huntington Library in California. In 1968 the London Underground Railway Society launched a fundraising appeal to microfilm the relevant material, and in January 1971 the microfilms were opened to researchers at the University of London Library (now Senate House Library).

In the 1973 documentary Metro-Land, John Betjeman spoke of a 1929 visit to Quainton Road, and of watching a train depart for Brill: "The steam ready to take two or three passengers through oil-lit halts and over level crossings, a rather bumpy journey".

Wotton station on the Great Western and Great Central Joint Railway, which in 1923 had been taken over by the London and North Eastern Railway, remained open (albeit little used and served by only two trains per day in each direction) until 7 December 1953, when the station was abandoned. The bridge that had formerly carried the GW&GCJR over the tramway at Wotton was demolished in 1970, and the former GW&GCJR station was converted to a private house.

Both Dorton Halt and Brill and Ludgersall stations were closed on 7 January 1963 and trains no longer stop; the line through them remains in use by trains between Princes Risborough and Bicester North. Quainton Road station was bought in 1969 by members of the London Railway Preservation Society to use as a permanent base, and now houses the Buckinghamshire Railway Centre. The station is still connected to the railway network and used by freight trains and occasional special passenger services, but no longer has a scheduled passenger service. There are no longer any open railway stations in the areas formerly served by the tramway. Plans have been proposed by the Buckinghamshire Railway Centre to rebuild and reopen a stretch of the tramway as a heritage railway, but this is now precluded by the construction of High Speed 2 across the former path of the tramway.

== See also ==
- Infrastructure of the Brill Tramway

== Notes and references ==
=== Bibliography ===
- Beckett, J. V. (1994). The Rise and Fall of the Grenvilles. Manchester: Manchester University Press. ISBN 0-7190-3757-3. OCLC 466661499.
- Demuth, Tim (2003). The Spread of London's Underground. Harrow Weald: Capital Transport. ISBN 1-85414-266-6.
- Foxell, Clive (2010). The Metropolitan Line: London's first underground railway. Stroud: The History Press. ISBN 978-0-7524-5396-5. OCLC 501397186.
- Halliday, Stephen (2001). Underground to Everywhere. Stroud: Sutton Publishing. ISBN 0-7509-2585-X.
- Horne, Mike (2003). The Metropolitan Line: An illustrated history. Harrow Weald: Capital Transport. ISBN 1-85414-275-5.
- Jones, Ken (1974). The Wotton Tramway (Brill Branch). Locomotion Papers. Blandford: The Oakwood Press. ISBN 0-85361-149-1.
- Jones, Robin (2010). Britain's Weirdest Railways. Horncastle, Lincolnshire: Mortons Media Group. ISBN 978-1-906167-25-7.
- Lee, Charles E. (1935). "The Duke of Buckingham's Railways: with special reference to the Brill line". The Railway Magazine. Vol. 77, no. 460. pp. 235–241.
- Melton, Ian (1984). R. J., Greenaway (ed.). "From Quainton to Brill: A history of the Wotton Tramway". Underground. No. 13. Hemel Hempstead: The London Underground Railway Society. ISSN 0306-8609.
- Mitchell, Vic; Smith, Keith (2006). Aylesbury to Rugby. Midhurst: Middleton Press. ISBN 1-904474-91-8.
- Sheahan, James Joseph (1862). History and Topography of Buckinghamshire. London: Longman, Green, Longman and Roberts. OCLC 1981453.
- Simpson, Bill (1985). The Brill Tramway. Poole: Oxford Publishing. ISBN 0-86093-218-4.
- Simpson, Bill (2005). A History of the Metropolitan Railway. Vol. 3. Witney: Lamplight Publications. ISBN 1-899246-13-4.
- Wolmar, Christian (2004). The Subterranean Railway. London: Atlantic. ISBN 1-84354-023-1.
