= Wotton railway station (Great Central Railway) =

Old Buckinghamshire station

Coordinates: 51.831371°N 0.992600°W

Wotton

General information
- Location: Wotton Underwood, Buckinghamshire; England
- Grid reference: SP695152
- Platforms: 2

Other information
- Status: Disused

History
- Original company: Great Central Railway
- Pre-grouping: Great Central Railway
- Post-grouping: London and North Eastern Railway

Key dates
- 2 April 1906: Station opened
- 7 December 1953: Station closed
Location

Wotton was a railway station at Wotton Underwood, Buckinghamshire, on the Great Central Railway's link line between Calvert and Ashendon Junction.

== History ==
The station was opened by the Great Central Railway on 2 April 1906, becoming part of the London and North Eastern Railway during the Grouping of 1923. It was built to the south of the point where the GCR crossed the Brill Tramway near its Wotton station. It was closed on 7 December 1953.

== Service ==
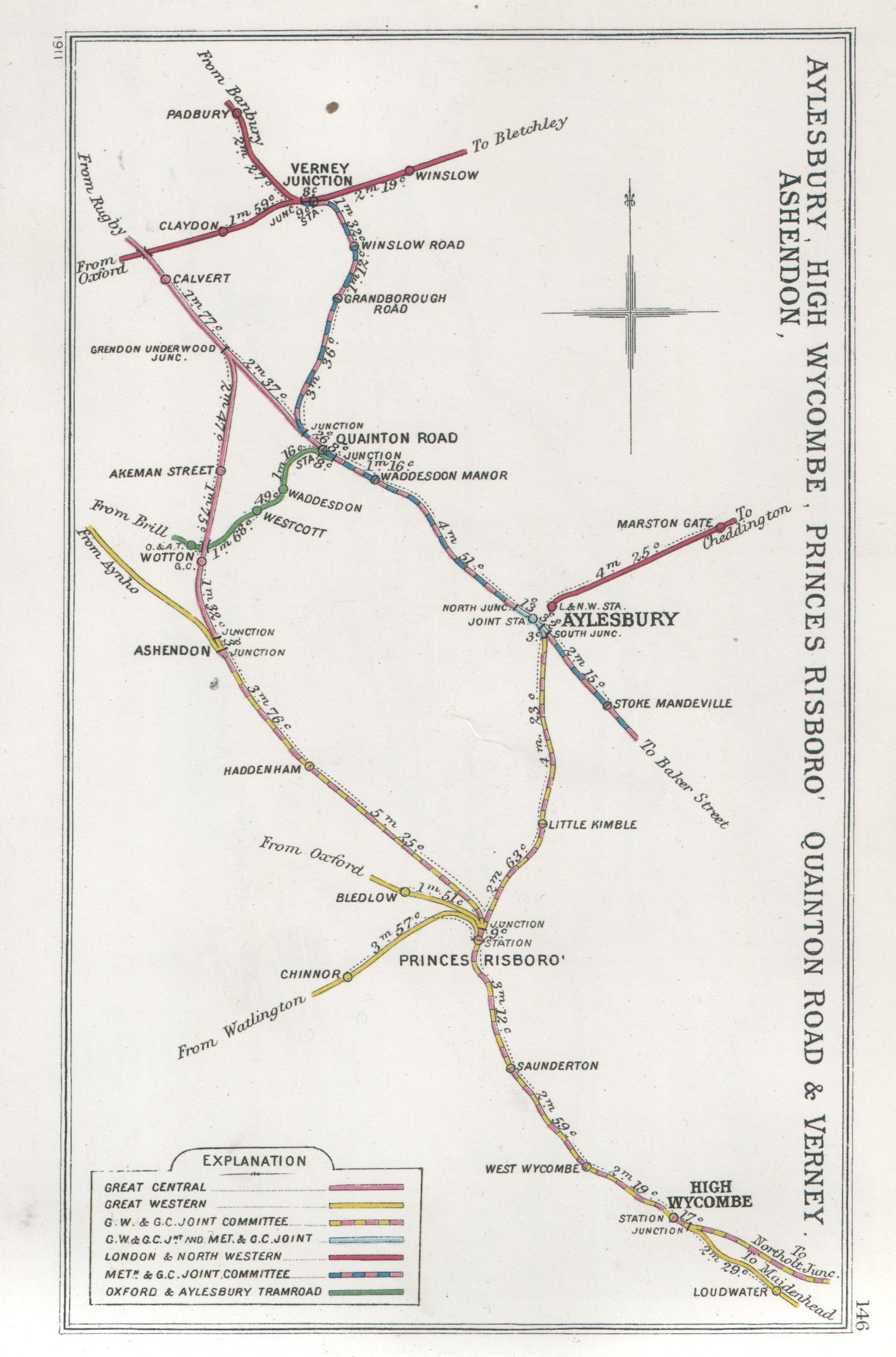
A 1911 Railway Clearing House map of railways in the vicinity of Wotton

Preceding station	Disused railways	Following station
Akeman Street; Line and station closed	Great Central Railway; London Extension	Haddenham; Line and station closed
