= Wotton Underwood =

Village in Buckinghamshire, England

Coordinates: 51.8378°N 1.0024°W

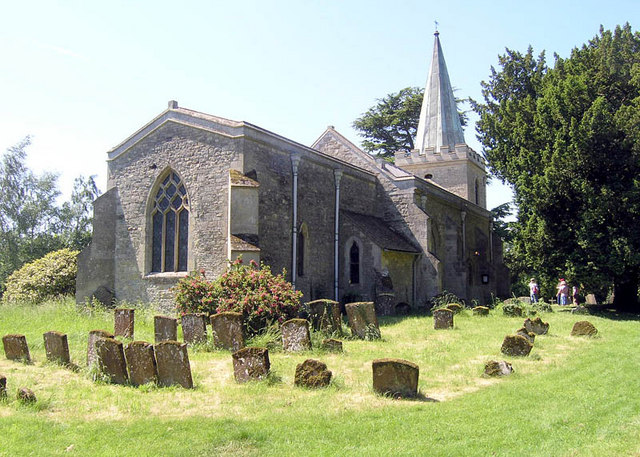
- All Saints' parish church

- Location within Buckinghamshire
- Area: 1.053 km^{2} (0.407 sq mi)
- Population: 119 (2011 Census)
  - Density: 113/km^{2} (290/sq mi)
- OS grid reference: SP6816
- Civil parish: Wotton Underwood
- Unitary authority: Buckinghamshire
- Ceremonial county: Buckinghamshire
- Region: South East
- Country: England
- Sovereign state: United Kingdom
- Post town: Aylesbury
- Postcode district: HP18
- Police: Thames Valley
- Fire: Buckinghamshire
- Ambulance: South Central
- UK Parliament: Mid Buckinghamshire

Wotton Underwood is a village and civil parish in Buckinghamshire, England, 7 miles (11 km) north of Thame, Oxfordshire.

The toponym is derived from the Old English for "farm near a wood". It is recorded in the Anglo-Saxon Chronicle of AD 848 as Wudotun and in the Domesday Book of 1086 as Oltone. The affix "Underwood" was added later to distinguish the village from other places also called Wotton. The affix means "near the wood" and refers to the village's nearness to the ancient Bernwood Forest.

The present manor house in the village, Wotton House, dates from the early eighteenth century, but has been much altered since, notably by John Soane in the 1820s. The former stables, now called South Pavilion, was the home of actor John Gielgud; it was bought by Tony and Cherie Blair for £4m, in 2008.

== Church ==
The parish church of All Saints is a Grade II* listed building, with parts dating from the 12th century: it was largely rebuilt in 1867 by G. E. Street for the Duke of Buckingham. The South aisle contains several monuments to members of the Grenville family, who were lords of the manor from the 12th to the 18th century. There are also monuments to Richard, 3rd Duke of Buckingham and Chandos (d. 1889), and his wife Caroline, Duchess of Buckingham and Chandos (d. 1874).

All Saints's Church is a member of the Bernwode Benefice of the Church of England, which covers Wotton Underwood, along with the village parishes of Ashendon, Boarstall, Brill, Chilton, Dorton, and Ludgershall.

== Railways ==
The Brill Tramway, originally known as the Wotton Tramway and, from 1899, part of the Metropolitan Railway, which served the area, had a station named Wotton which closed in 1935 with the rest of the line.

The Great Central Railway built a line from Grendon Underwood to Princes Risborough, and upon that opened a station at Wotton in 1906; this closed in 1953.

== Geography ==
The parish is on a mid-height escarpment of the outer Chiltern Hills and has an irregular shape generally bounded by headwaters. It includes a southern thin projection skirting Ashendon. Two streams rise just outside the area and flow into the south-centre from west and east and then flow north. Its relatively small area and low population itself was reduced by an enclosure act - see Wotton House. In 1821 its population reached 344 residents, which has not been exceeded since. Otherwise bereft of woods and lakes, the west part has two lakes and the Warrens, an area of woodland laid out by Wotton House. The number of houses fell from 73 in 1951 to 42 ten years later.

== Notable residents ==
- The Dukes of Buckingham and Chandos
- William Grenville, 1st Baron Grenville
- John Gielgud
- Tony Blair
