= Dorton Halt railway station =

Former railway station in England

Coordinates: 51.8246°N 1.0116°W

Dorton Halt
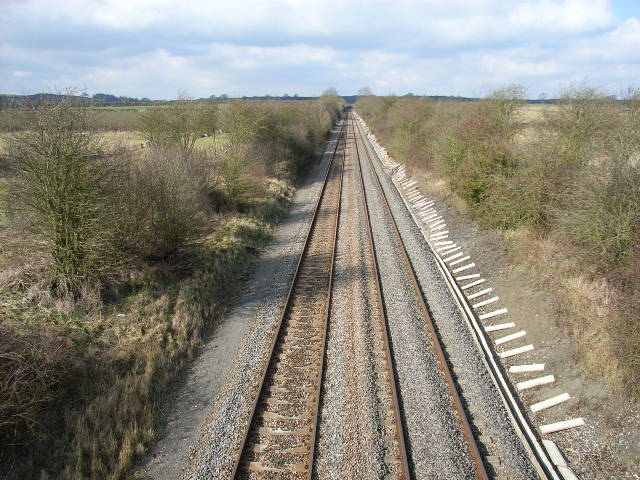
- Station site in 2006.

General information
- Location: Dorton, Buckinghamshire; England
- Grid reference: SP681144
- Platforms: 2

Other information
- Status: Disused

History
- Original company: Great Western Railway
- Post-grouping: Great Western Railway; Western Region of British Railways

Key dates
- 21 July 1937: Station opens
- 7 January 1963: Station closes
Location

Dorton Halt railway station was a railway station serving the village of Dorton in Buckinghamshire. It was on what is now known as the Chiltern Main Line. The station was geographically nearer to Brill than Brill and Ludgershall railway station.

== History ==
Dorton Halt was opened on 21 July 1937, being situated between Brill & Ludgershall and Haddenham on the Great Western Railway's Bicester cut-off line, which had opened in 1910. It was built to serve the villages of Dorton, Wotton, Chilton and Ashendon, which lay in an agricultural district, and together had a population of 650. There were two platforms, each with a shelter; the station was electrically lit. The line became part of the Western Region of British Railways on nationalisation in 1948. British Railways closed the station on 7 January 1963.

| Preceding station | Historical railways | Following station |
|---|---|---|
| Brill and Ludgershall; Line open, station closed | Great Western Railway; Bicester "cut-off" | Haddenham; Line open, station closed |
