= Haddenham railway station (Buckinghamshire) =

Former railway station in England

Coordinates: 51.7672°N 0.9356°W

Haddenham
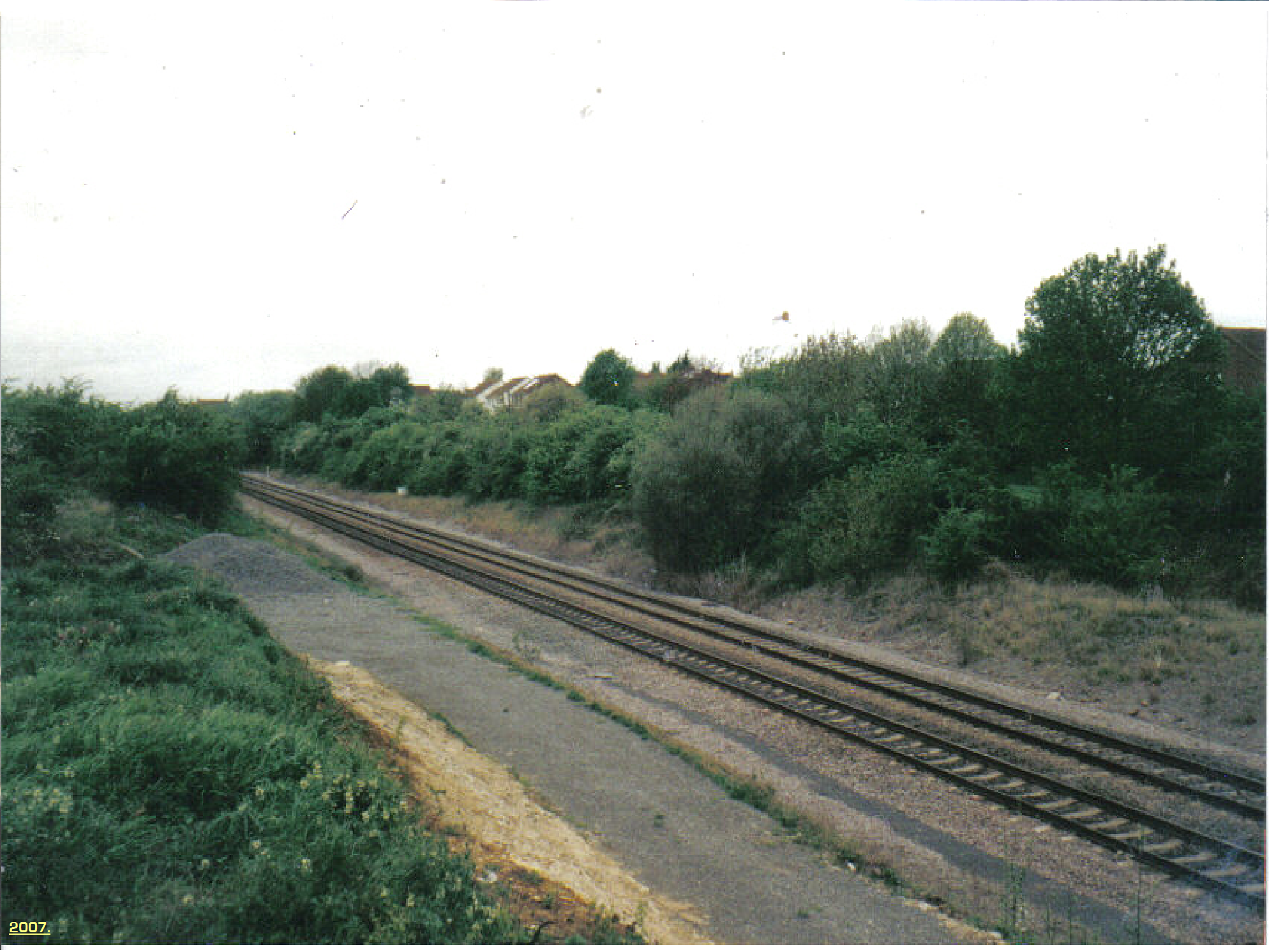
- Site of Haddenham station in 2007.

General information
- Location: Haddenham, Buckinghamshire, Buckinghamshire; England
- Grid reference: SP735081
- Platforms: 2

Other information
- Status: Disused

History
- Original company: Great Western and Great Central Joint Railway
- Pre-grouping: GW & GC Joint
- Post-grouping: GW & GC Joint

Key dates
- 2 April 1906: Station opened
- 7 January 1963: Station closed
- 5 October 1987: New station opened further north as Haddenham & Thame Parkway
Location

Haddenham railway station was on the former Great Western and Great Central Joint Railway between Princes Risborough and Ashendon Junction. It was closed in 1963.

== History ==
The Great Western & Great Central Joint Committee was created on 1 August 1899 with the dual objective of providing the Great Central Railway with a second route into London, bypassing the Metropolitan Railway; and of providing the Great Western Railway with a shorter route to the Midlands. The line ran from Northolt Junction to Ashendon Junction; the central section of its route was an existing GWR line. North of Princes Risborough a new line was constructed, which opened for goods on 20 November 1905, and for passengers on 2 April 1906. The only station originally provided on that new line was Haddenham, which was built on the western side of Haddenham village, on the north side of the present-day Station Road. The station was closed on 7 January 1963.

Twenty-four years later, a new station was opened about 1/2 mile (0.80 km) to the north-west, named Haddenham and Thame Parkway.

== Route ==
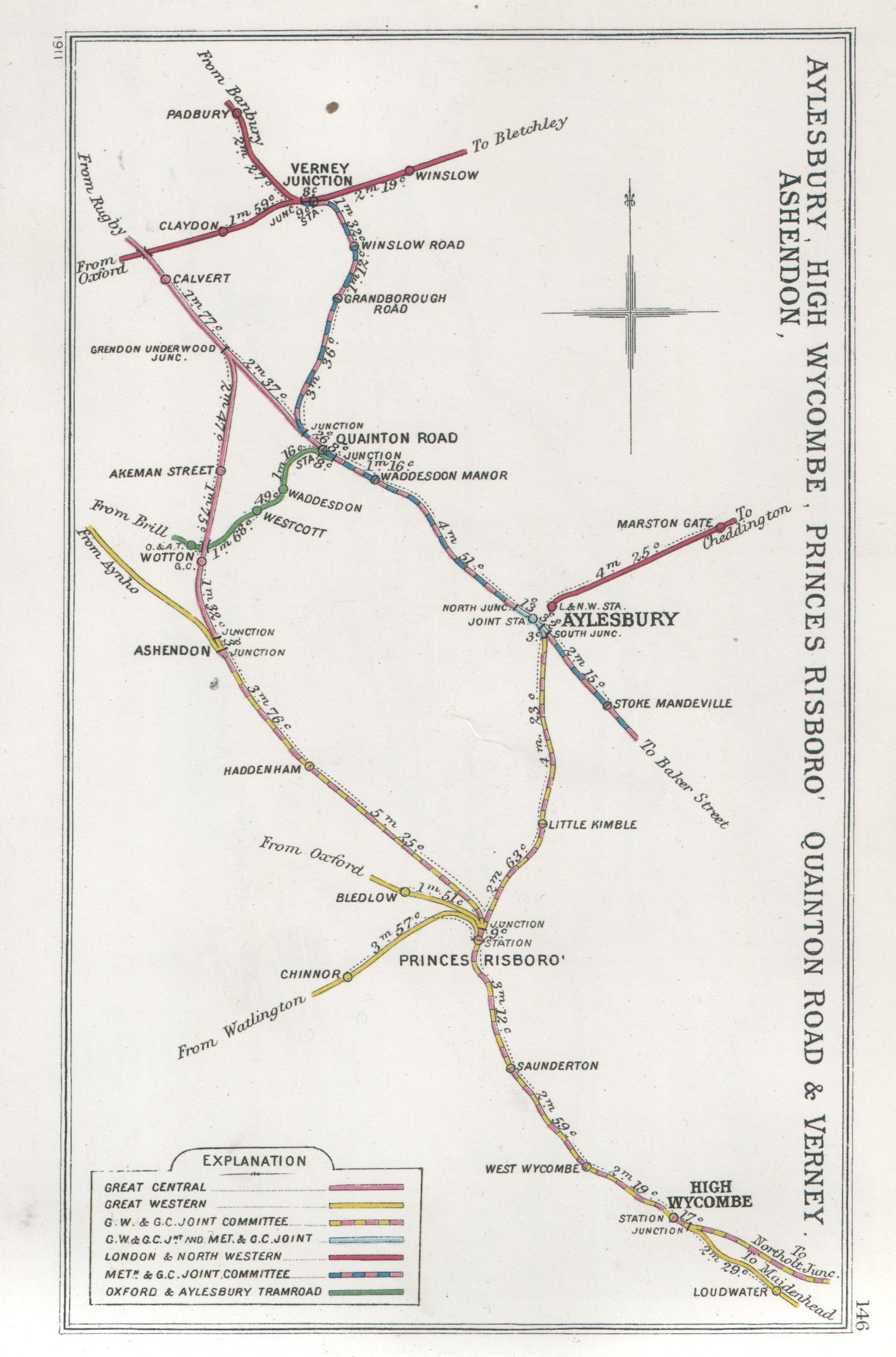
A 1911 Railway Clearing House map of railways in the vicinity of Haddenham

Preceding station	Historical railways	Following station
Dorton Halt; Line open, station closed	Great Western Railway; Bicester "cut-off"	Ilmer Halt; Line open, station closed
Wotton; Line and station closed	Great Central Railway; London Extension	Ilmer Halt; Line open, station closed
