= Ilmer Halt railway station =

Former railway station in England

Coordinates: 51.7448°N 0.8849°W

Ilmer Halt

General information
- Location: Ilmer, Buckinghamshire; England
- Grid reference: SP760057
- Platforms: 2

Other information
- Status: Disused

History
- Original company: Great Western and Great Central Joint Railway
- Post-grouping: GW & GC Joint

Key dates
- 1 April 1929: Station opened
- 7 January 1963: Station closed
Location

Ilmer Halt railway station was a former halt on the Great Western and Great Central Joint Railway serving the village of Ilmer in Buckinghamshire.

== History ==
The Great Western & Great Central Joint Committee was created on 1 August 1899 with the dual objective of providing the Great Central Railway with a second route into London, bypassing the Metropolitan Railway; and of providing the Great Western Railway with a shorter route to the Midlands.

The line ran from Northolt Junction to Ashendon Junction; the central section of its route was an existing GWR line. North of Princes Risborough a new line was constructed, which opened for goods on 20 November 1905, and for passengers on 2 April 1906.

The station was closed in 1963. The halt was demolished and little remains.

== Route ==
Preceding station	Historical railways	Following station
Haddenham (Bucks); Line open, station closed	Great Western and Great Central Joint Railway	Princes Risborough; Line and station open
