= Akeman Street railway station =

Former GCR/LNER Railway Station in Buckinghamshire

Coordinates: 51.85751°N 0.97732°W

Akeman Street
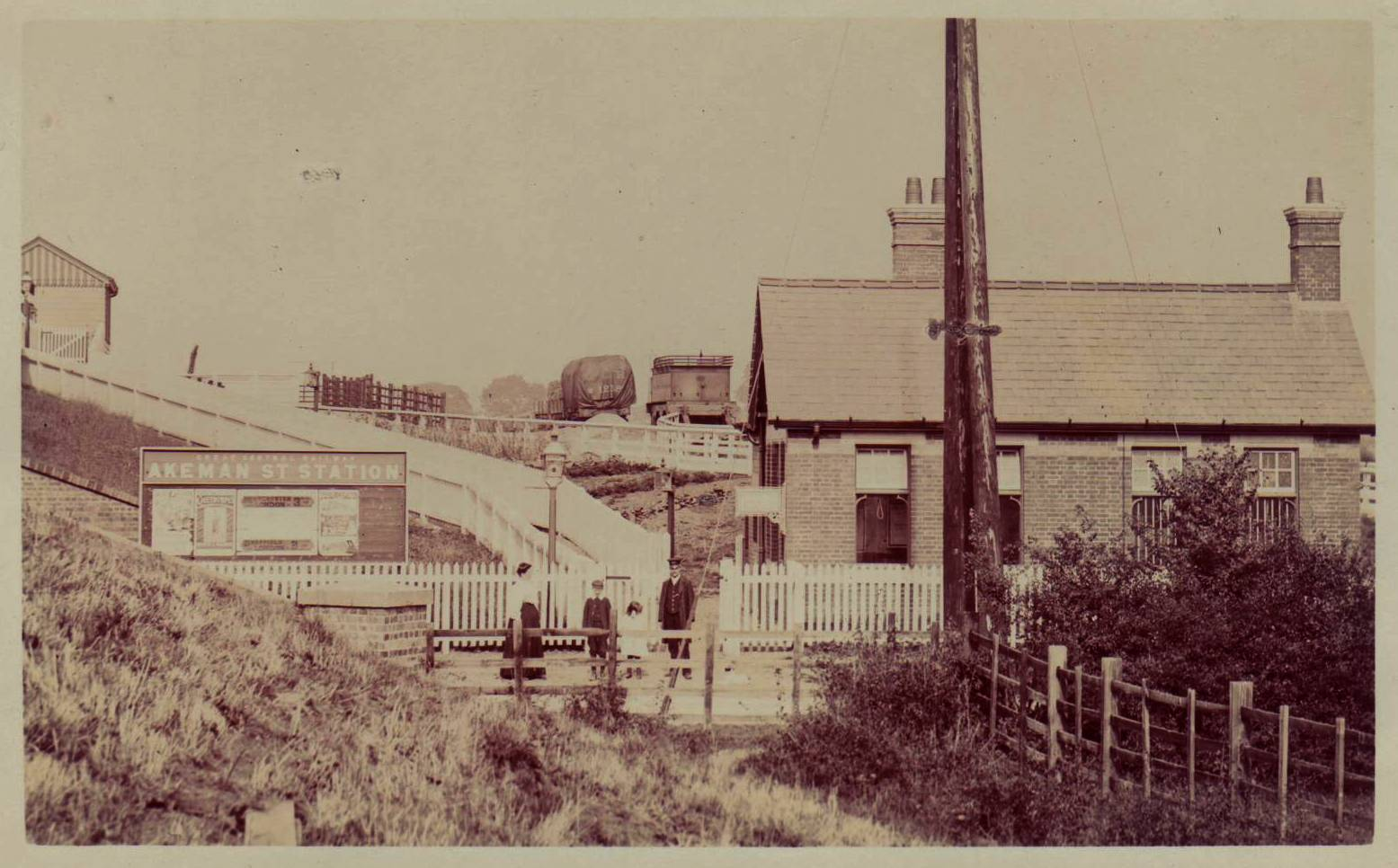
- Station in early 1900s.

General information
- Location: Woodham, Buckinghamshire; England
- Grid reference: SP705182
- Platforms: 2

Other information
- Status: Disused

History
- Original company: Great Central Railway
- Pre-grouping: Great Central Railway
- Post-grouping: London and North Eastern Railway

Key dates
- 2 April 1906: Opened for goods
- 3 September 1907: Opened for passengers
- 7 July 1930: Closed for passengers
- 2 October 1931: Closed for goods
Location

Akeman Street was a railway station at Woodham, Buckinghamshire, where the railway linking Ashendon Junction and Grendon Underwood Junction crossed the Akeman Street Roman road (now the A41 road).

== History ==
The station was opened by the Great Central Railway, becoming part of the London and North Eastern Railway during the Grouping of 1923. That company then closed the station seven years later.

== The site today ==
The buildings and platforms on top of the embankment have long been demolished, but the brick-built main station building down at road level remains and is now a private house. An overgrown single track from the former Great Central Main Line, the remains of the link to the GW/GC joint line, finishes in a set of stop blocks at the north end of the site. In August 2014 the Calvert Landfill site acquired the track bed from Akeman Street station running up to Calvert station. The track bed was transformed into a private road for landfill vehicles. This greatly reduced dirt, congestion and pot holes on local roads.

== Service ==
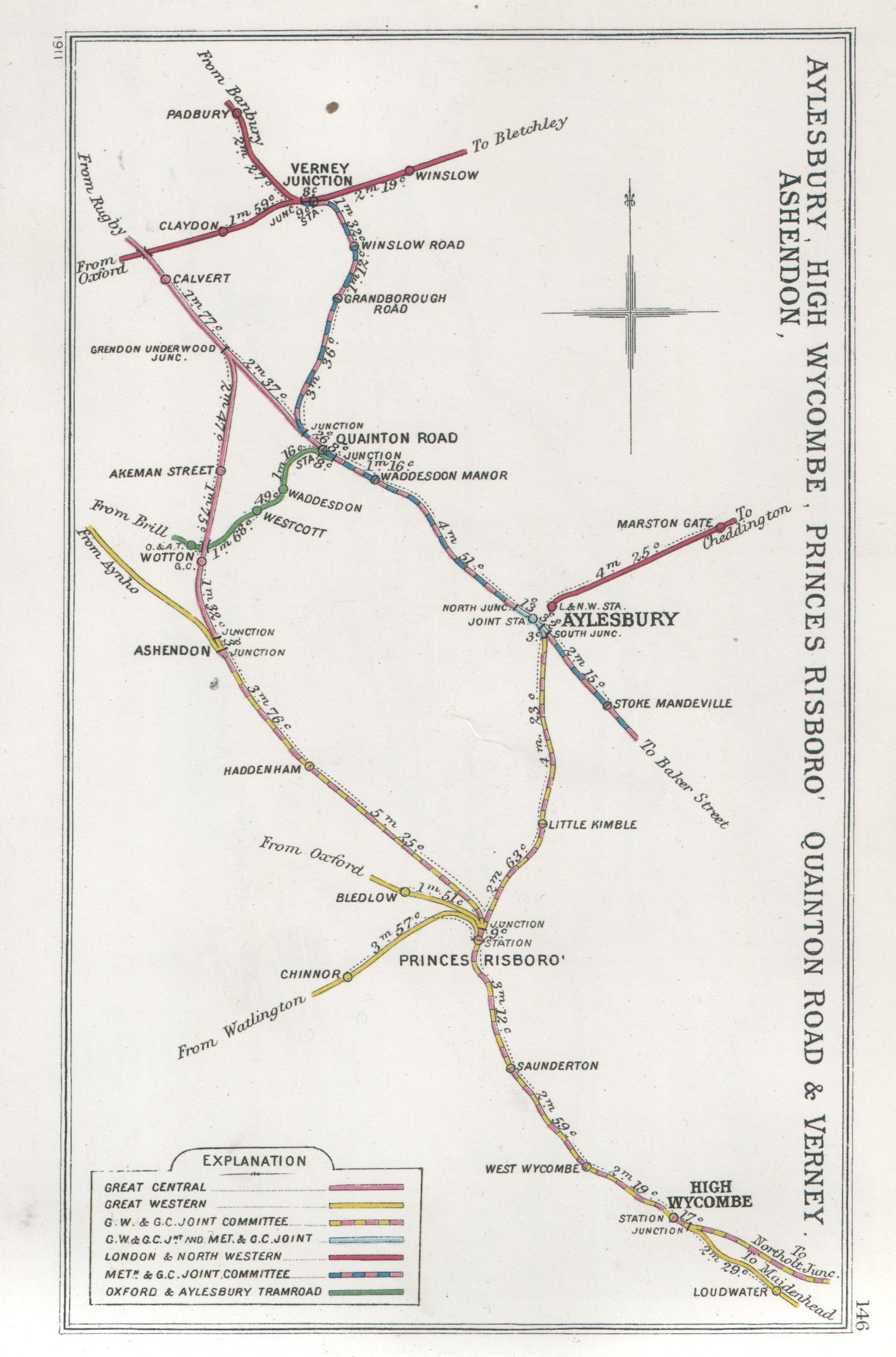
A 1911 Railway Clearing House map of railways in the vicinity of Akeman Street

| Preceding station | Disused railways | Following station |
|---|---|---|
| Calvert; Line and station closed | Great Central Railway; London Extension | Wotton; Line and station closed |
