= Ludgershall =

Ludgershall is the name of more than one place. The name is Anglo Saxon in origin, meaning 'nook with a trapping spear'.

In the United Kingdom:

- Ludgershall, Buckinghamshire, England
- Ludgershall, Wiltshire, England
  - Ludgershall (UK Parliament constituency), former parliamentary borough
