= Ilmer =

Village in Buckinghamshire, England

Coordinates: 51.746°N 0.886°W

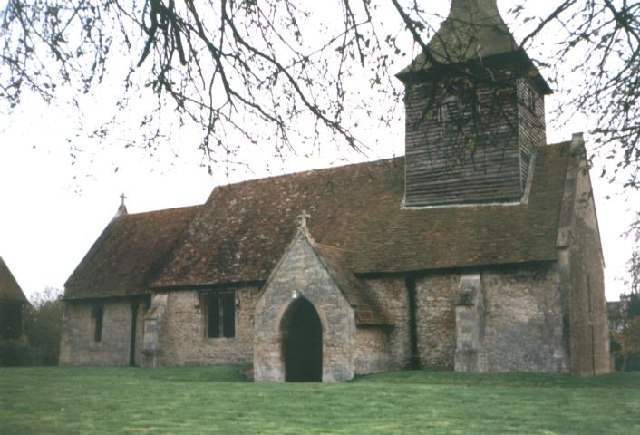
- St Peter's parish church

- Location within Buckinghamshire
- OS grid reference: SP7605
- Civil parish: Longwick-cum-Ilmer
- Unitary authority: Buckinghamshire
- Ceremonial county: Buckinghamshire
- Region: South East
- Country: England
- Sovereign state: United Kingdom
- Post town: Princes Risborough
- Postcode district: HP27
- Dialling code: 01844
- Police: Thames Valley
- Fire: Buckinghamshire
- Ambulance: South Central
- UK Parliament: Mid Buckinghamshire constituency
- Website: Longwick-cum-Ilmer Parish Council

Ilmer is a village in the civil parish of Longwick-cum-Ilmer, in Buckinghamshire, England. It is at the foot of the Chiltern Hills about 3 miles (5 km) northwest of Princes Risborough, near the boundary with Oxfordshire.

Ilmer was an ancient parish. In 1934 it was abolished and the area became part of the new civil parish of Longwick-cum-Ilmer. At the 1931 census (the last before the abolition of the parish), Ilmer had a population of 40.

== Toponymy ==
The village toponym is derived from the Old English for 'Ylla's boundary', referring to the ancient boundary with Oxfordshire. The Domesday Book of 1086 records the village as Imere.

== Parish church ==
The nave of the Church of England parish church of Saint Peter dates from the 12th century. In the 14th century the chancel was rebuilt and a south transept was added to the nave. In the 16th century the timber-framed and weatherboarded bellcote was added to the west end of the building. In 1662 the south transept was demolished. The building was restored in 1859–60 under the direction of the Oxford Diocesan architect, G.E. Street.

The bellcote has three bells, all of them cast by bellfounders from Reading, Berkshire. The tenor was cast in about 1500, probably by William Hasylwood. William Knight cast the second bell in 1568 and Henry Knight cast the treble in 1618.

St Peter's is a Grade II* listed building.

== Railway history ==
In 1899–1905 the Great Western and Great Central Joint Railway was built through the parish. In 1906 Ilmer Halt was opened on the line to serve the village. British Railways closed the halt in 1963. The railway remains open as part of the Chiltern Main Line from London.

In 1968, a scene from Albert R. Broccoli's Chitty Chitty Bang Bang was filmed along the railway line in which the Baron Bomburst's spies capture the wrong car with Lord Scrumptious inside.

== Sources ==
- Page, William, ed. (1927). A History of the County of Buckingham, Volume 4. Victoria County History. pp. 61–63.
- Pevsner, Nikolaus (1960). Buckinghamshire. The Buildings of England. Harmondsworth: Penguin Books. p. 175.
