= Brill and Ludgershall railway station =

Disused railway station in England

Coordinates: 51.84751°N 1.04526°W

Brill & Ludgershall
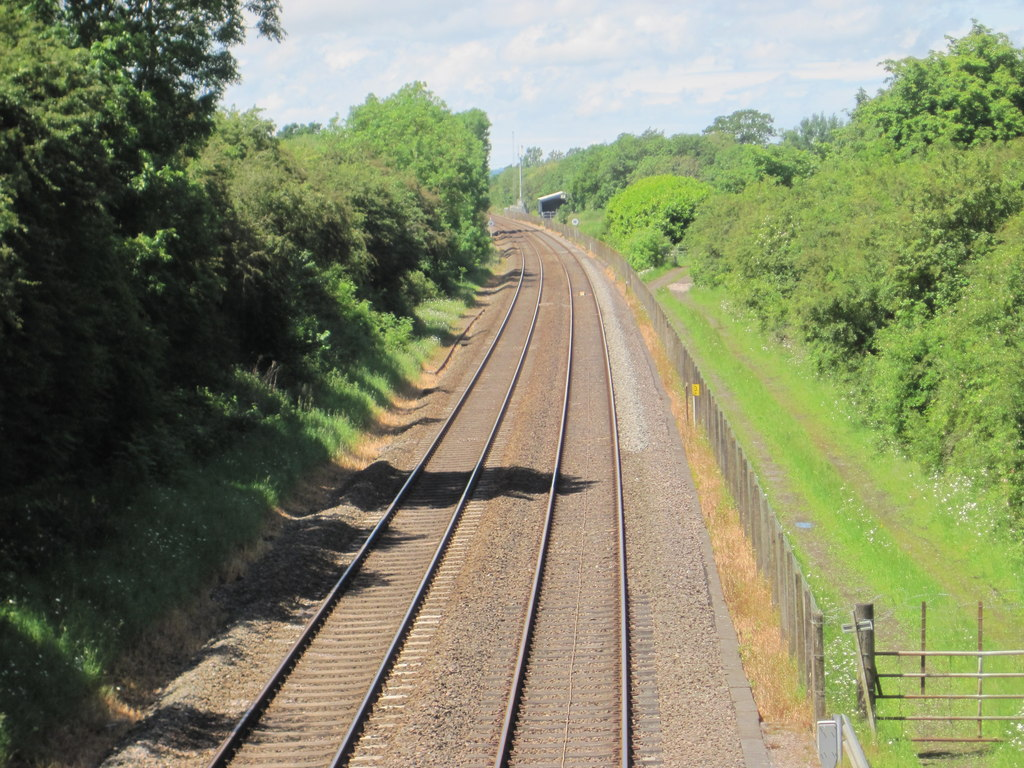
- The site of the station in 2014

General information
- Location: Ludgershall, Buckinghamshire; England
- Grid reference: SP659168
- Platforms: 2

Other information
- Status: Disused

History
- Original company: Great Western Railway
- Pre-grouping: Great Western Railway
- Post-grouping: Great Western Railway; Western Region of British Railways

Key dates
- 1 July 1910: Station opens
- 7 January 1963: Station closes
Location

Brill and Ludgershall railway station was a railway station serving the villages of Brill and Ludgershall in Buckinghamshire. It was on what is now known as the Chiltern Main Line.

== History ==
Brill and Ludgershall was one of six new stations that the Great Western Railway provided when it opened the high-speed Bicester cut-off line between Princes Risborough and Kings Sutton in 1910. The line became part of the Western Region of British Railways on nationalisation in 1948. It had sidings by 1951 British Railways closed the station and sidings in 1963.

Preceding station	Historical railways	Following station
Blackthorn; Line open, station closed	Great Western Railway; Bicester "cut-off"	Dorton Halt; Line open, station closed
