= Ashendon =

Village in Buckinghamshire, England

Coordinates: 51.82°N 00.98°W

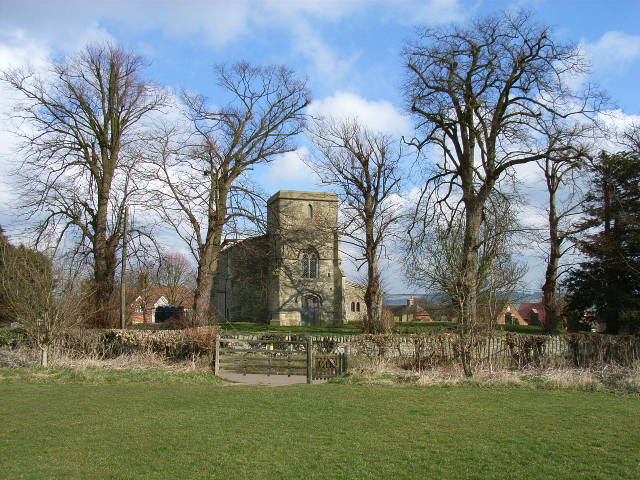
- St. Mary's parish church

- Location within Buckinghamshire
- Population: 249 (2011 census)
- OS grid reference: SP7014
- Civil parish: Ashendon
- Unitary authority: Buckinghamshire
- Ceremonial county: Buckinghamshire
- Region: South East
- Country: England
- Sovereign state: United Kingdom
- Post town: Aylesbury
- Postcode district: HP18
- Police: Thames Valley
- Fire: Buckinghamshire
- Ambulance: South Central
- UK Parliament: Mid Buckinghamshire
- Website: Welcome to Ashendon

Ashendon is a small village and civil parish in Buckinghamshire, England. It is about nine miles west of Aylesbury and seven miles north of Thame.

The toponym is derived from the Old English for "Hill overgrown with ash trees". The Domesday Book of 1086 records the village as the property of the Grenville family; it was called Assedune. The original name refers to the fact that in Saxon times this area was forested, serving as hunting land for the king.

In recent times the manor of Ashendon passed into the hands of the Marquis of Buckingham.

Included in with the parish of Ashendon are the hamlets of Upper Pollicott and Lower Pollicott. The names of these hamlets derive from the Anglo-Saxon Pol's Cottage.

In the less distant past, Ashendon was an entirely farming village and, at present, there is still much agricultural activity. However, some of the farmhouses have been converted into private residences, including Ashendon Farm and its barns. Although Ashendon is small, it has a pub, a recreational playing field, a church and a social club.

One mile south-west of the village, near Lower Pollicott, on the Chiltern Main Line between Princes Risborough and Bicester North, is the site of the former Ashendon Junction, which was an elaborate flying junction engineered for a high-speed turnout on to the now-dismantled link to the now disused Great Central Main Line at Grendon Underwood Junction. In former times this route was used by express trains between London Marylebone, Leicester and Sheffield.
