= Calvert railway station =

Former railway station in Buckinghamshire, England

Calvert
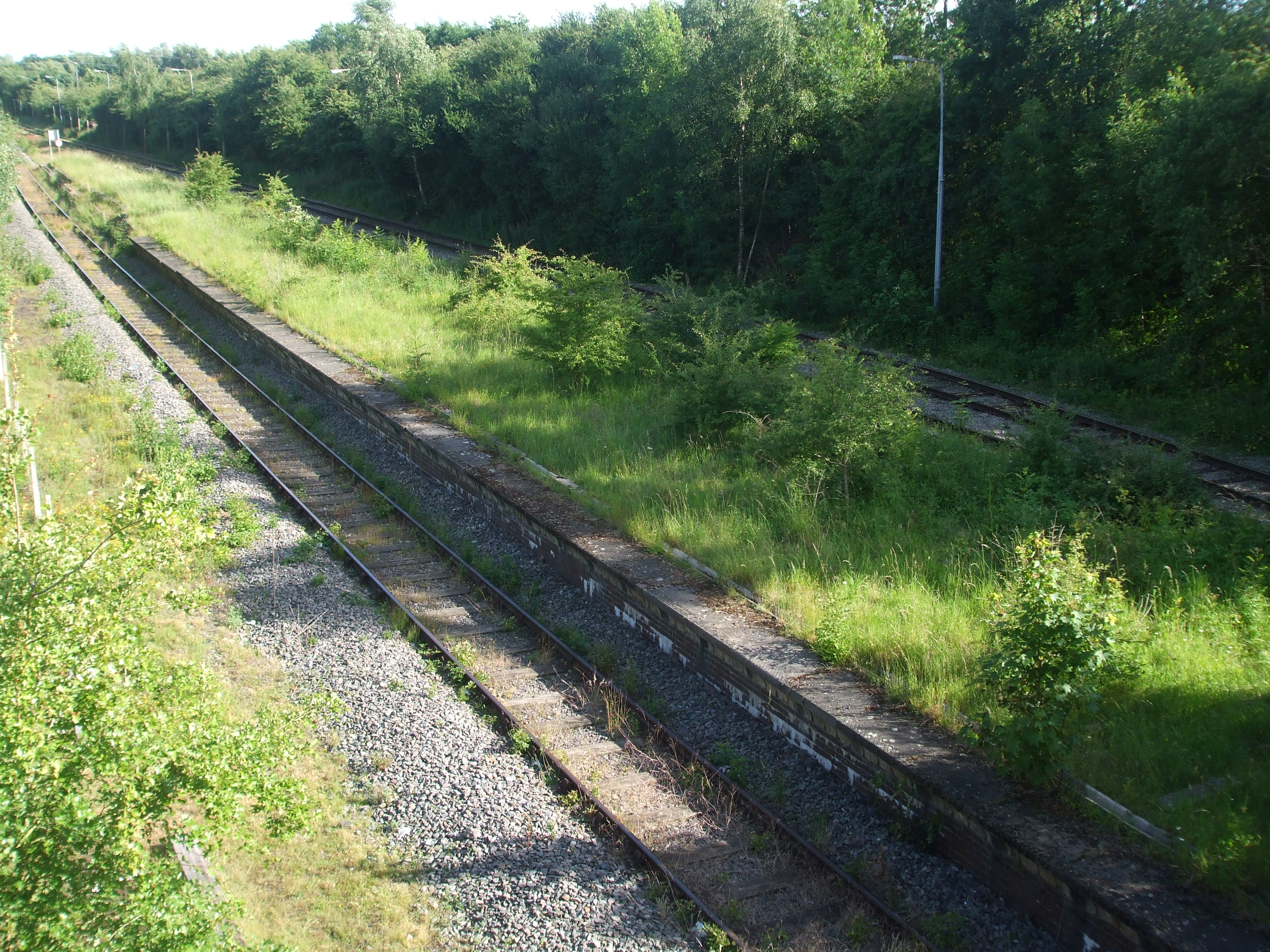
- The site of the former station, 2008

General information
- Location: Calvert, Buckinghamshire, England
- Coordinates: 51.91657°N 0.99965°W
- Grid reference: SP689247
- Platforms: 2

Other information
- Status: Disused

History
- Original company: Great Central Railway
- Pre-grouping: Great Central Railway
- Post-grouping: London and North Eastern Railway, London Midland Region of British Railways

Key dates
- 15 March 1899: Opened
- 4 March 1963: Closed to passengers
- 4 May 1964: Closed to goods
Location

Calvert was a railway station that served the village of Calvert, in Buckinghamshire, England. It was a stop on the former Great Central Main Line between Manchester London Road and London Marylebone. The station was opened in 1899; it was closed to passengers in 1963 and goods in 1964.

== History ==
Calvert was the last station on the Great Central's London Extension before it reached the Metropolitan Railway's station at Quainton Road, 4 1/2 miles (7 km) away. The station and line between Brackley Central and Quainton Junction were constructed by Walter Scott and Company of Newcastle-upon-Tyne.

Although the station was named Calvert, no such place existed at the time. The name was that of the local landowner, Sir Harry Verney, who had been born a Calvert but changed his name upon succeeding to the Verney Baronetcy.

At the time, Calvert was a very rural settlement with the few houses making up the village being situated close to the station and nearby brickworks, which was the largest employer in the area. In Great Central style, the station had a single island platform, located below a road overbridge, from the centre of which a staircase led down to the platform; the centre piers of the bridge were left hollow to provide lamp rooms. The design was chosen as it would allow the track to be quadrupled if ever required.

About 2 1/2 miles (4 km) south of Calvert was Grendon Underwood Junction, where Calvert Cabin signal box controlled the line as it split into two: one line branching out towards Princes Risborough, the other towards Amersham.

A connecting spur, brought into use on 14 September 1940, linked the Oxford – Cambridge Varsity Line with the Great Central at Calvert, allowing much of the freight which used the Verney Junction – Quainton Road section to be diverted over the Great Central. Calvert was to remain open a further 23 years before closing to passengers on 4 March 1963, the same day as nearby Quainton Road. Fast passenger trains continued to pass through the station until 1966, when the Great Central Main Line was closed.

== Routes ==
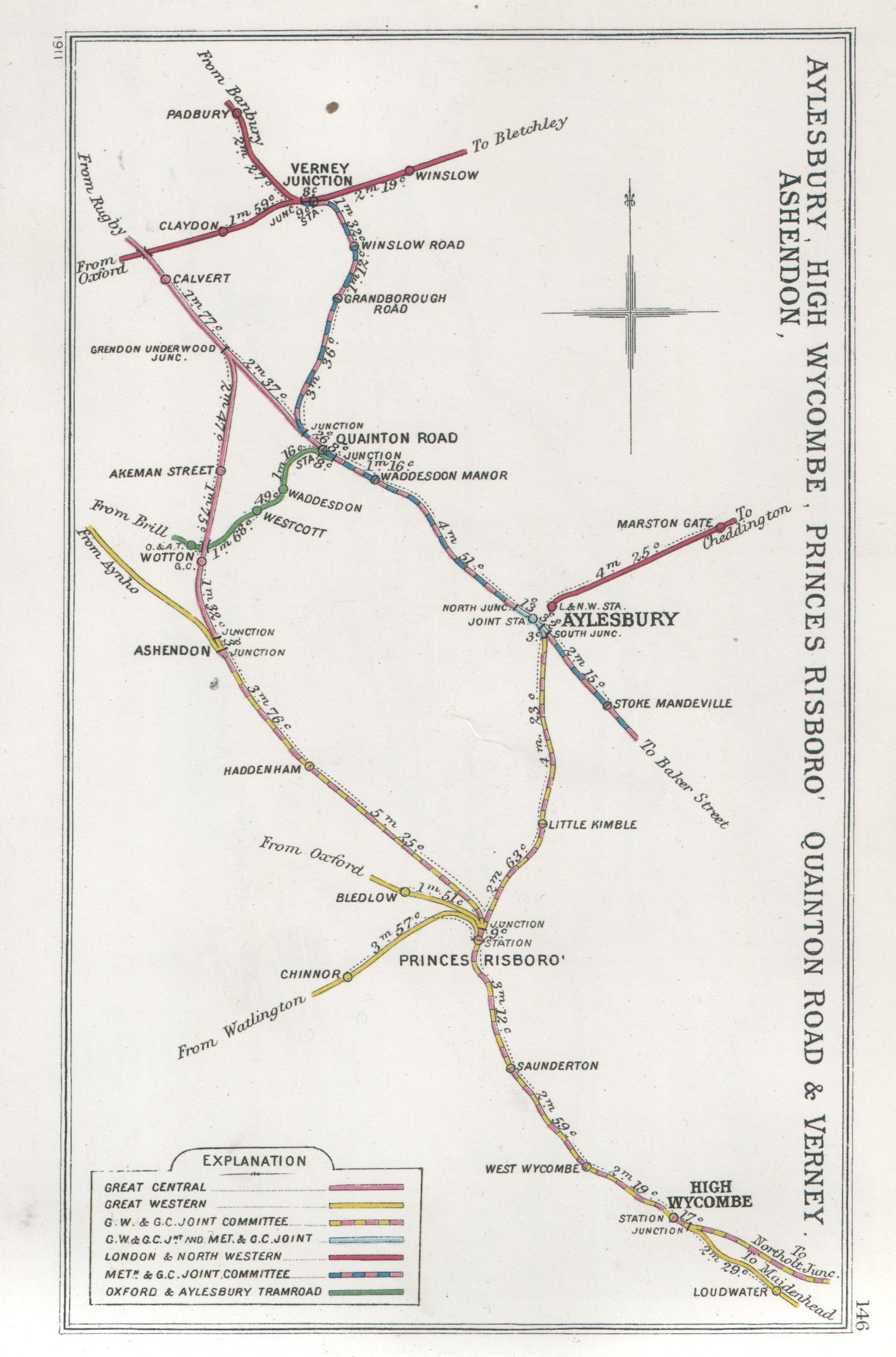
A 1911 Railway Clearing House map of railways in the vicinity of Calvert

Preceding station	Disused railways	Following station
Quainton Road; Line and station closed	Great Central Railway; London Extension	Finmere; Line and station closed
Akeman Street; Line and station closed	Great Central Railway; London Extension	Finmere; Line and station closed

== The site today ==
The station buildings have long since been demolished; the track through the station was lifted in 2021 and the platforms were removed in May 2022. The station master's house was demolished in 2023.

== Future plans ==
The line of High Speed 2 is under construction and will pass through the site of the disused station. This location, called Thame Road, and a fall-back site, Great Pond, were announced in December 2010 as the site for the HS2 maintenance depot. The nearby Calvert Waste Plant has also been identified for heat and power generation. A railhead at Calvert is being used to deliver construction materials for High Speed 2.

Just to the north of the former station site, the route of the former Varsity Line has been rebuilt as East West Rail, which passes over HS2 and provides rail access to its planned Calvert Infrastructure Maintenance Depot. The original scope of this section of EWR included reopening the branch line to Aylesbury but, in May 2023, the EWR Company announced that the Aylesbury branch was not being funded..
