= Buckingham House, Pall Mall =

Historic British building

Coordinates: 51.506°N 0.135°W

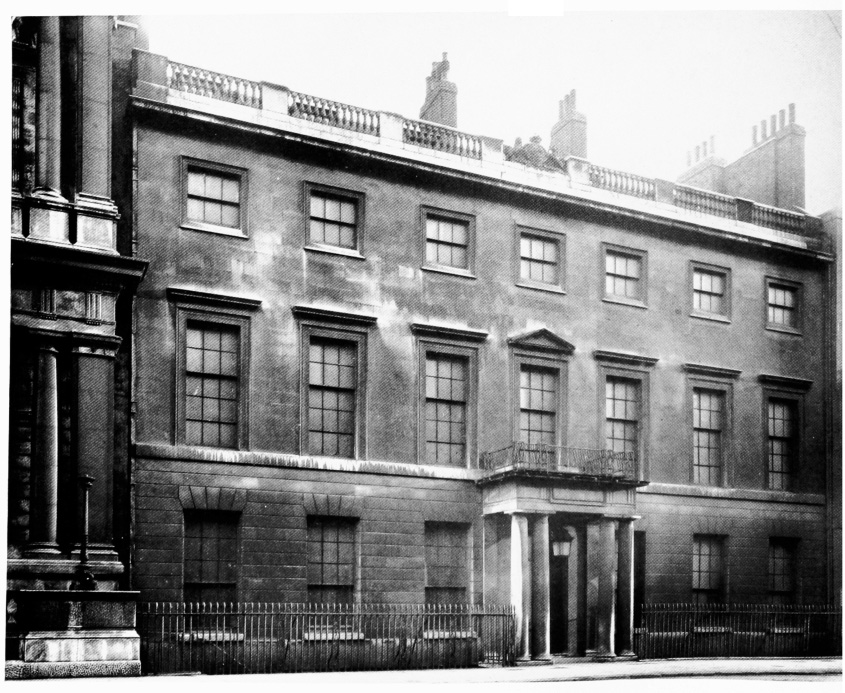
- Buckingham House in 1907, a year before it was demolished
- Interactive map of the Buckingham House, Pall Mall area

General information
- Architectural style: Neo-Palladian
- Location: 91 Pall Mall, London
- Construction started: 1790
- Completed: 1795
- Demolished: 1908

Design and construction
- Architect: Sir John Soane

Buckingham House was a residence of the Dukes of Buckingham and Chandos in Pall Mall, London. Designed by the Neoclassical architect Sir John Soane in 1790, it featured the Neo-Palladian style for the three-storey-high frontage. The construction work finished in 1795.

The house was demolished in 1908, and the Royal Automobile Club occupies the site today.

== Bibliography ==
- Weinreb, Ben; Hibbert, Christopher; Keay, Julia; Keay, John (2008). The London Encyclopedia. Pan MacMillan. ISBN 978-1-4050-4924-5.
