= Ludgershall, Buckinghamshire =

Village in Buckinghamshire, England

Coordinates: 51.852°N 1.041°W

Ludgershall
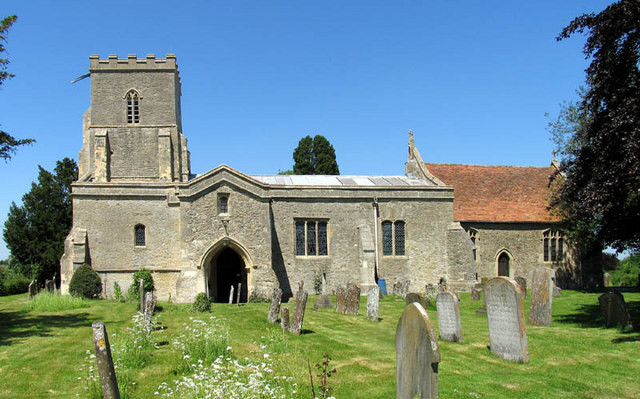
- St Mary the Virgin parish church

- Location within Buckinghamshire
- Population: 409 (2011 Census)
- OS grid reference: SP661174
- Civil parish: Ludgershall
- Unitary authority: Buckinghamshire
- Ceremonial county: Buckinghamshire
- Region: South East
- Country: England
- Sovereign state: United Kingdom
- Post town: Aylesbury
- Postcode district: HP18
- Dialling code: 01844
- Police: Thames Valley
- Fire: Buckinghamshire
- Ambulance: South Central
- UK Parliament: Mid Buckinghamshire
- Website: Ludgershall Village Buckinghamshire

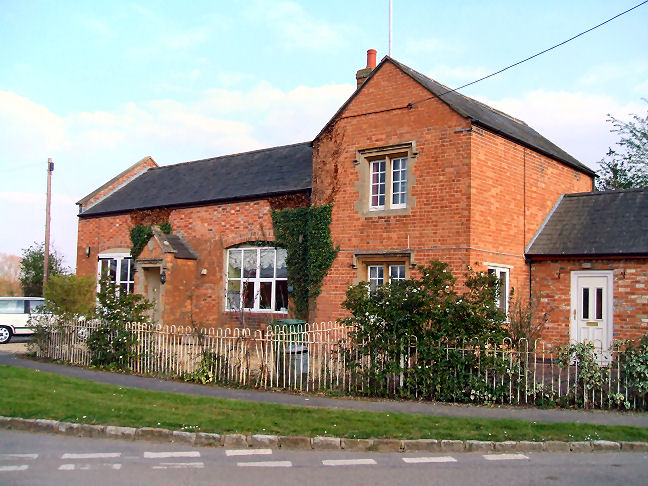
The former schoolhouse, now a private home

Ludgershall is a village and civil parish in the unitary authority area of Buckinghamshire, England. It is near the boundary with Oxfordshire, about 5.5 miles (9 km) south-east of Bicester and 5 miles (8 km) west of Waddesdon.

== Toponym ==
The toponym is said to be derived from the Old English for "nook with a trapping spear" but this is disputed. It occurs in more than one place in England (see Ludgershall (disambiguation)). The Domesday Book of 1086 records the village as Litlegarsele. The place spelt at Lotegarshale, seen in 1381, may refer to the Buckinghamshire village, or the one in Wiltshire.

== History ==
Henry II granted land in the parish to the priory of Santingfeld in Picardy, France. It is possible that a hospital was founded on this land, although it is uncertain. In the reign of Henry VI, when all alien church possessions were seized by the Crown, this land was given to King's College, Cambridge.

The theologian John Wyclif was vicar of Ludgershall 1368–74.

== St Mary the Virgin Church ==
The parish church of St Mary the Virgin on Church Lane is a Grade I listed church, dating from the 14th century with 19th century additions. The Bible scholar John Wycliffe is reported to have been an early vicar.

== Ludgershall Bike Night ==
The village plays host to an annual charity motorbike night, typically on the first Monday in July. The free to attend meet sees riders of vintage, classic and contemporary motorcycles gather on the village green. The event is attended by multiple motorcycle clubs and enthusiasts alike.

== Sources & further reading ==
- Page, William, ed. (1905). "Hospitals: Ludgershall". A History of the County of Buckingham, Volume 1. Victoria County History. p. 395.
- Page, William, ed. (1927). "Ludgershall with Kingswood". A History of the County of Buckingham, Volume 4. Victoria County History. pp. 68–73.
- Pevsner, Nikolaus (1973) [1966]. Buckinghamshire. The Buildings of England. Harmondsworth: Penguin Books. pp. 196–197. ISBN 0-14-071019-1.
