= Ashendon Junction =

Coordinates: 51.8143°N 0.9952°W

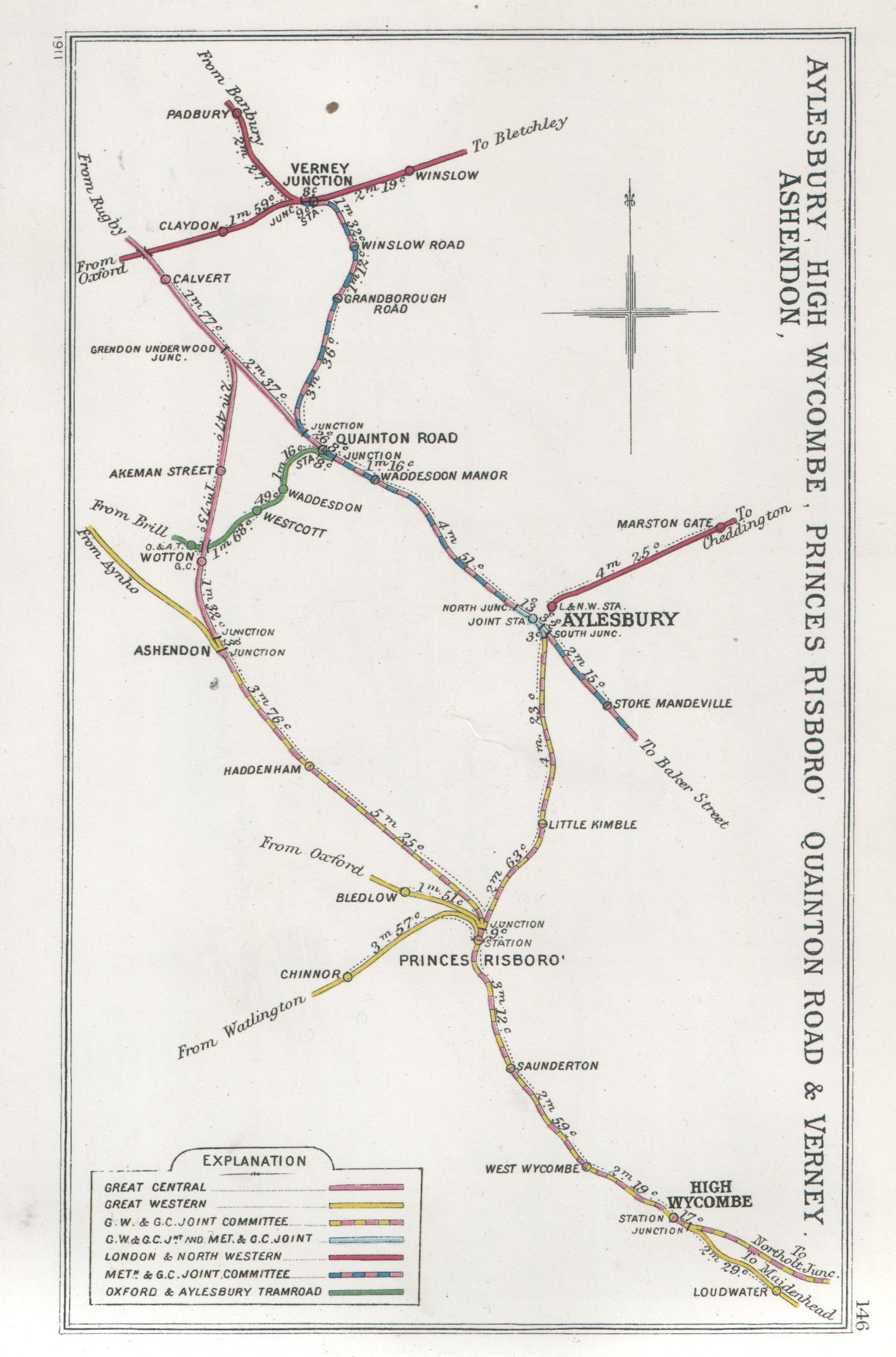
A 1911 Railway Clearing House Junction Diagram. Ashendon Junction is centre left, where the Great Western (yellow) and Great Central (pink) diverge

Ashendon Junction in Buckinghamshire, England, was a major mainline railway junction where, from July 1910, the Great Western Railway's (GWR) London-Birmingham direct route diverged from the Great Central Railway's (GCR) main London-Sheffield route. It was near the small village of Ashendon, about 10 miles north-east of Oxford.

The junction was where what is now the Chiltern Main Line (formerly the "Birmingham Direct Line" aka "Bicester cut-off" of the GWR), inaugurated in 1910, joined the post-1906 "Alternative Route" alignment of the GCR. It was located 3 miles 44 chains (5.71 km) north-west of today's Haddenham and Thame Parkway; 44 miles 4 chains (70.89 km) from London Paddington via Northolt Junction, and 45 miles 31 chains (73.04 km) from London Marylebone via Neasden and Northolt Junctions. It was a high-speed flying junction carrying southbound GWR trains from Birmingham via Bicester North (Engineer's Line Reference NAJ2) on an embankment with a girder bridge over the top of northbound Great Central trains travelling from London Marylebone on to the 90 mph five-mile link to Grendon Underwood Junction (Engineer's Line Reference GUA) where they rejoined the original Great Central Main Line towards Brackley and beyond to the East Midlands and North. The signal box, located on the up side of GCR tracks was the only one on the joint line of a GCR design. Signalling was also of the GCR upper quadrant type.

== Closure ==
When the Great Central was closed south of Rugby in September 1966, the junction became redundant and the trackwork was later dismantled. The link to Grendon Underwood was already relatively little used by then, at least as far as passenger trains were concerned, most services from Marylebone towards Brackley and beyond using the original GC route through Aylesbury after long-distance expresses were ended in 1960.

Few signs of the old Great Central lines can now be seen from ground level on the site of the junction itself, but the trackbed is clearly visible from the air. Immediately north of the site, the Great Central trackbed towards Grendon Underwood is still intact. Little other evidence remains, except that over the best part of a mile the twin tracks of the Chiltern route still diverge at this point, a relic of the old layout preserved when Chiltern Railways redoubled the line between Princes Risborough and Aynho Junction in 1998, it having been singled in the late 1960s.
