= Railways in Buckinghamshire =

Overview of the railway system in Buckinghamshire

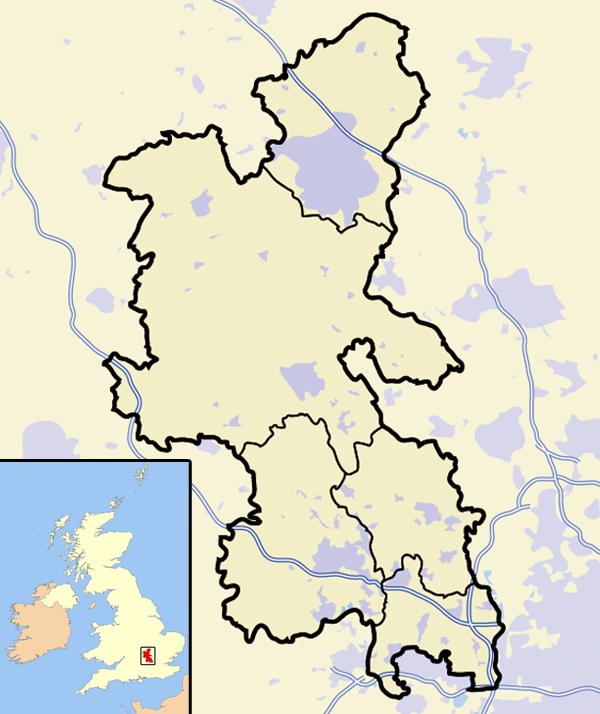
Buckinghamshire

The railway system of Buckinghamshire has a long and complex history dating back to the 1830s with the opening of sections of today's West Coast Main Line and Great Western Main Line. The development of Buckinghamshire's railway network was largely due to its position nationally as many long-distance routes chose to go through Buckinghamshire, especially between Britains two largest cities, London and Birmingham. The county had its own pulling power in addition, as produce such as the Aylesbury duck could then be easily transported to the capital.

The railway system expanded enormously throughout the rest of the 19th century, but over-enthusiasm led to the construction of lines that made little, if any, profit. As a result, many of these lines were closed systematically during the 1930s and 1960s. In recent years, the benefits of railway travel have become more widespread, and once again the railway network of Buckinghamshire is expanding.

== History ==
=== Origins ===
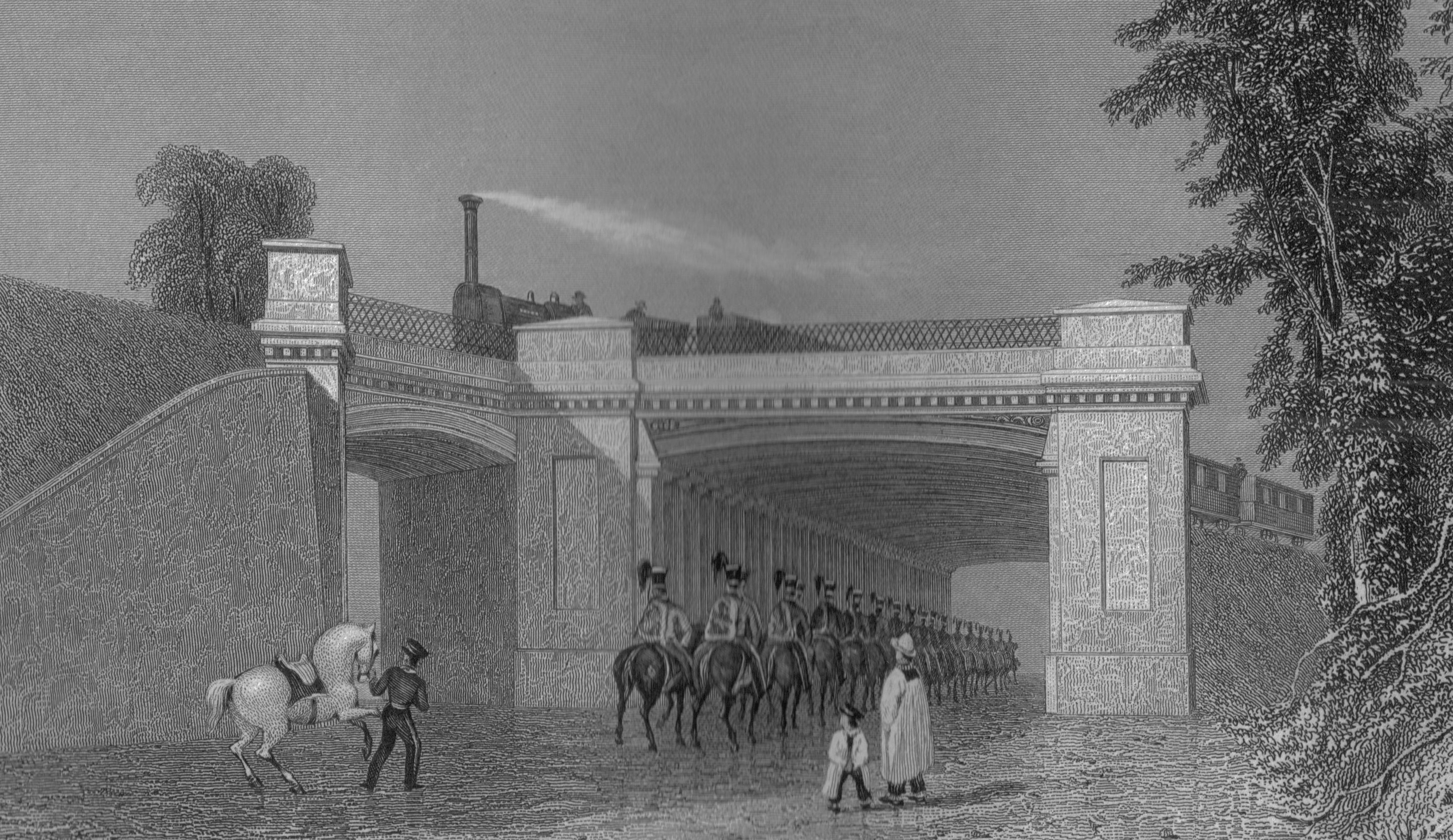
Denbigh Hall Bridge, in Buckinghamshire, was the terminus for several months before the line was completed north to Rugby

The railway boom of northern England led to the formation of the London and Birmingham Railway (L&BR) by Robert Stephenson in 1833, with the intention of meeting Joseph Locke's Grand Junction Railway at Birmingham, creating a north–south route. Though the rail line was initially planned to go through Buckingham, where carriage works would have been built, it was altered to Wolverton due to objection from the Duke of Buckingham. A line to Buckingham would later open in 1850. Construction of the L&BR began in November 1833 and the section from London Euston to Boxmoor in Hertfordshire opened in 1837. The line to Bletchley was completed by the summer of 1838; from there passengers took a stagecoach shuttle from a temporary station called Denbigh Hall to Rugby where the railway continued north. The line through what is now Milton Keynes opened several months later on 17 September 1838. Wolverton later became famous as the site of Wolverton railway works which produced rolling stock for over a century—the last new carriage was built there in 1962. The site now houses a supermarket.

At the same time, another railway company, the Great Western Railway (GWR) was formed in 1833, with the intention of linking London and the growing port of Bristol. Isambard Kingdom Brunel was appointed as engineer the same year. Construction began in the mid-1830s. The line from Paddington through Buckinghamshire was opened on 4 June 1838 terminating at Maidenhead Bridge station until Maidenhead Railway Bridge was completed. The line west into Berkshire opened on 1 July 1839. The line became notable for its use of broad gauge (which was favoured by Brunel) as opposed to standard gauge, which was preferred by most other railway engineers including George and Robert Stephenson. Other railways using standard gauge later met the GWR resulting in the gauge war which the GWR eventually lost. The section through Bucks had a third rail laid on 1 October 1861 allowing both standard and broad gauge trains to run. The broad gauge was removed throughout the country in 1892. The line through Buckinghamshire was quadrupled in late 19th century.

The path of the Buckinghamshire Railway, known as the Varsity line, today eventually linked Oxford and Cambridge, the section between Bedford and Cambridge opened in 1862.

In 1839, a branch line opened from Cheddington on the L&BR to Aylesbury, the county town of Buckinghamshire as a way of transporting goods, in particular the Aylesbury Duck to London. This however required a change at Cheddington, as the line was built connecting north towards Bletchley. The Aylesbury Railway, or Cheddington to Aylesbury Line was independent but operated by the L&BR up to 1846, when the L&BR and two other railway companies merged to form the London and North Western Railway (LNWR). From then onwards, the line was owned by the LNWR.

On 17 November 1846, another line was opened: the Oxford and Bletchley Railway, which ran between Bedford and Bletchley. Part of the railway was built on land belonging to the Duke of Bedford, as he was an enthusiastic supporter of its construction, and that part of the railway was important: one of the stations located on the Duke's land, Woburn Sands, had a brickyard that used the railway to transport its products, and the depot itself was used as the line's coal depot. The Oxford and Bletchley Railway merged with the Buckingham and Brackley Junction Railway in 1847 to form the Buckinghamshire Railway, which was extended a year later in 1850 to Banbury. A junction was formed in 1851 at Verney for the line from there to Oxford. The Buckinghamshire Railway was worked by the LNWR from July 1851 on, and it was later absorbed by the LNWR in 1879.

In July 1846, the Wycombe Railway was incorporated by an Act of Parliament, allowing the construction of a branch line from Maidenhead, in Berkshire on the GWR to High Wycombe, a major furniture producing town. Construction began in 1852 and was completed two years later in 1854. Building works included a new bridge over the River Thames; the Bourne End Railway Bridge was wooden when first built, but replaced by an iron truss bridge in 1895. The line was single track and used the broad-gauge. The Wycombe Railway was extended in 1862 to Thame with another branch from Princes Risborough to Aylesbury in 1863. (Note: There was no connection to the LNWR station at Aylesbury High Street railway station) The line to Oxford was completed a year later in 1864. The Wycombe Railway was leased to the GWR, and bought outright by the GWR in 1867. The line was converted to standard gauge in 1870.

Two lines serving Windsor in Berkshire opened in 1849—both competing for traffic from the Royalty and tourists. The Windsor, Staines and South Western Railway was authorised in 1847, the Staines to Windsor Line opening its first section from Staines-upon-Thames in Middlesex to Datchet in Buckinghamshire on 22 August 1848. Due to opposition from both Windsor Castle and Eton College, the line into Windsor was delayed- the line into Windsor & Eton Riverside opened on 1 December 1849. The Windsor, Staines and South Western Railway was absorbed by the London and South Western Railway (LSWR) in 1848. In the same year, 1849, the Slough to Windsor & Eton Line opened from Slough in Buckinghamshire to Windsor & Eton Central again receiving opposition from Eton College. Originally laid as broad-gauge, dual gauge, allowing standard and broad gauge trains to run was laid in 1862. For a brief period between 1883 and 1885, the District Railway ran services between London and Windsor & Eton Central via Ealing Broadway over the GWR tracks from Slough.

The Aylesbury and Buckingham Railway was formed next in August 1860 to build a line between Aylesbury (Note: The current GWR Aylesbury station, not the LNWR Aylesbury High Street) and Verney Junction on the LNWR Buckinghamshire Railway. It opened in 1868 but trains never ran to Buckingham- even though Verney Junction had a connection to Banbury via Buckingham. From 1871, services to Waddesdon Road operated over the Brill Tramway began. Known initially as the Wooton Tramway, it was built primarily for the use of the Third Duke of Buckingham and extended to Brill in 1872, terminating quite a distance from the village itself.

The Watlington and Princes Risborough Railway opened in 1872 from the existing junction at Princes Risborough to the town of Watlington in Oxfordshire. It was operated by the GWR which originally intended to extend the line to meet the Cholsey and Wallingford Railway leading to the Great Western Main Line at Cholsey railway station, however funds were never found for the extension.

=== Metroland ===
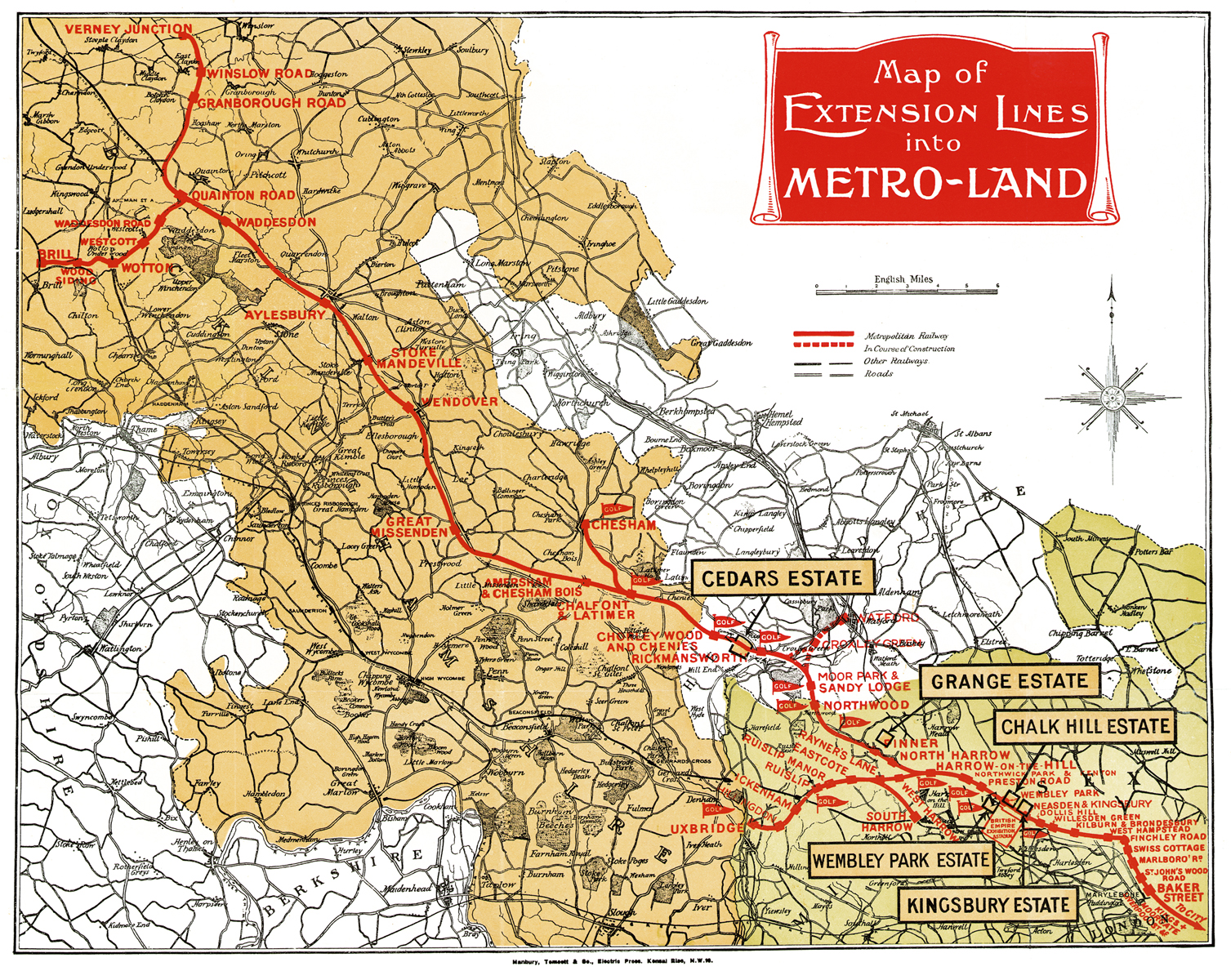
Map of "Metro-land", from the 1924 Metro-land booklet published by the Metropolitan Railway. The county boundary of Buckinghamshire is shown.

The Metropolitan Railway had been the first underground mass-transit railway system in the world when it opened in 1863. In 1868 the Metropolitan and St John's Wood Railway opened a branch from Baker Street to Swiss Cottage, that company being taken over by the Metropolitan Railway in 1879. The line was extended several times from then onwards. The line first entered Buckinghamshire on 8 July 1889 to Chesham but further extension into the Chiltern Hills took place via Amersham in 1892, turning the Chesham route into a branch line. The extension of 1892 terminated at the GWR station in Aylesbury which had opened in 1863.

The Metropolitan Railway was now stretching deep into Buckinghamshire, over land termed Metroland by the Met itself in 1915. In 1891, the Metropolitan had absorbed the Aylesbury & Buckingham Railway which had run from Aylesbury to Verney Junction. On 1 January 1894, the Metropolitan Railway was extended over the A&BR to Verney Junction meeting the LNWR owned Buckinghamshire Railway which had opened in 1850. The Metropolitan Railway (popularly called the 'Met') thus ran express services from central London to Verney Junction, in the middle of rural Buckinghamshire—a testament to this being that the terminus was so rural that the station was named after the local landowner, Sir Harry Verney. The Met's final extension in Buckinghamshire was over the Brill Tramway which was absorbed on 1 December 1899, almost fifty miles out of central London. Indeed, the extent of the Metropolitan line was so great that for many years the line could not be accommodated into the London Underground Tube map.

=== The last main line ===
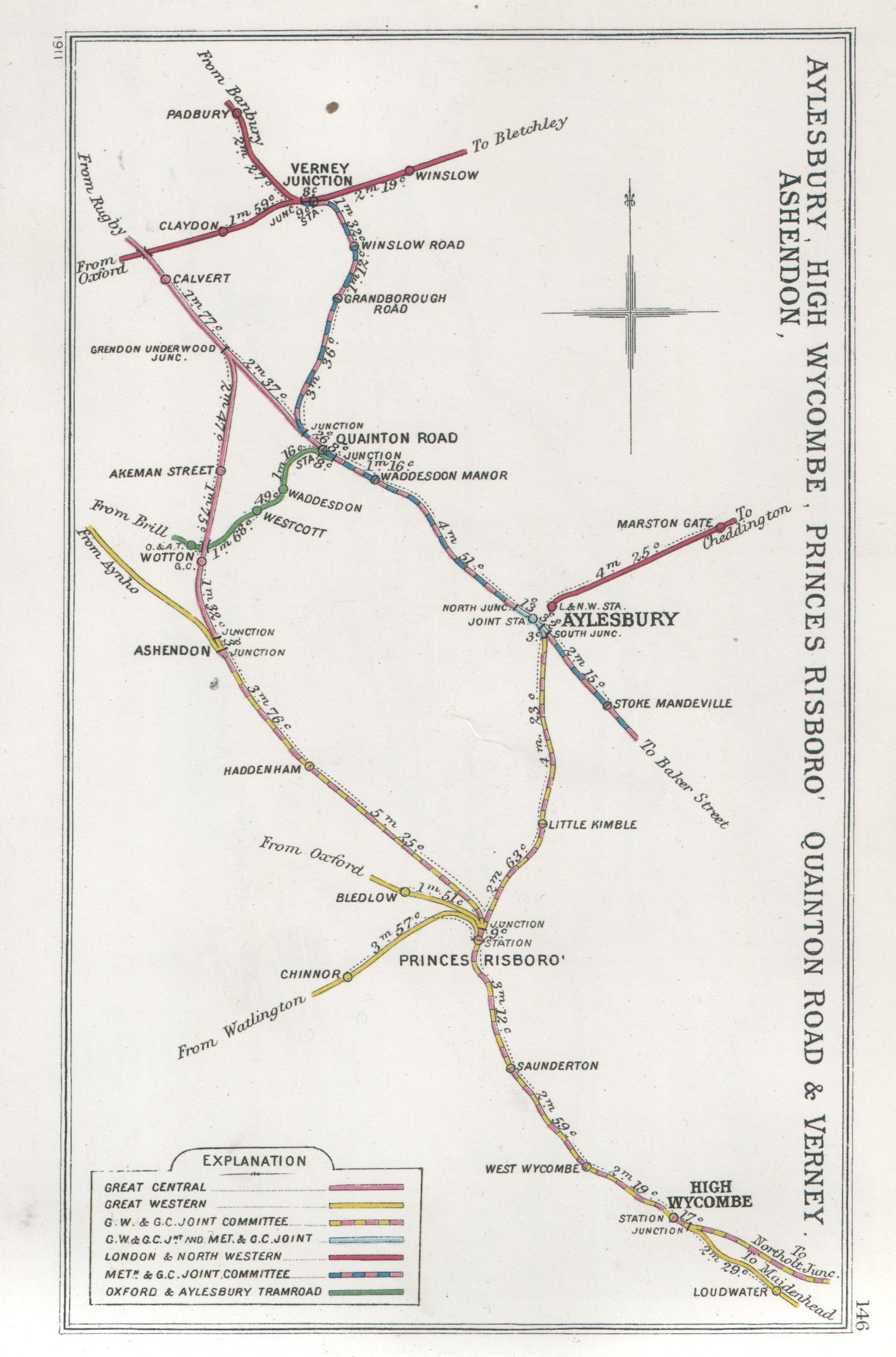
The railways of western Buckinghamshire at their peak.

The next railway to weave its way through Buckinghamshire was the Manchester, Sheffield and Lincolnshire Railway which had formed a network of railways in the north of England. In 1897, it changed its name to become the Great Central Railway in anticipation of its London extension. The MS&LR had been a modest company, until Sir Edward Watkin became general manager in 1854. His ambition was to build a rail tunnel under the English Channel in which his trains would run. He was determined to build a line south to London and the South Coast- to do this he became chairman of both the South Eastern Railway which ran between London and Dover and the Metropolitan Railway. Both companies were of use to Watkin as they provided a clear route between Dover and the already existing MS&LR near Nottingham.

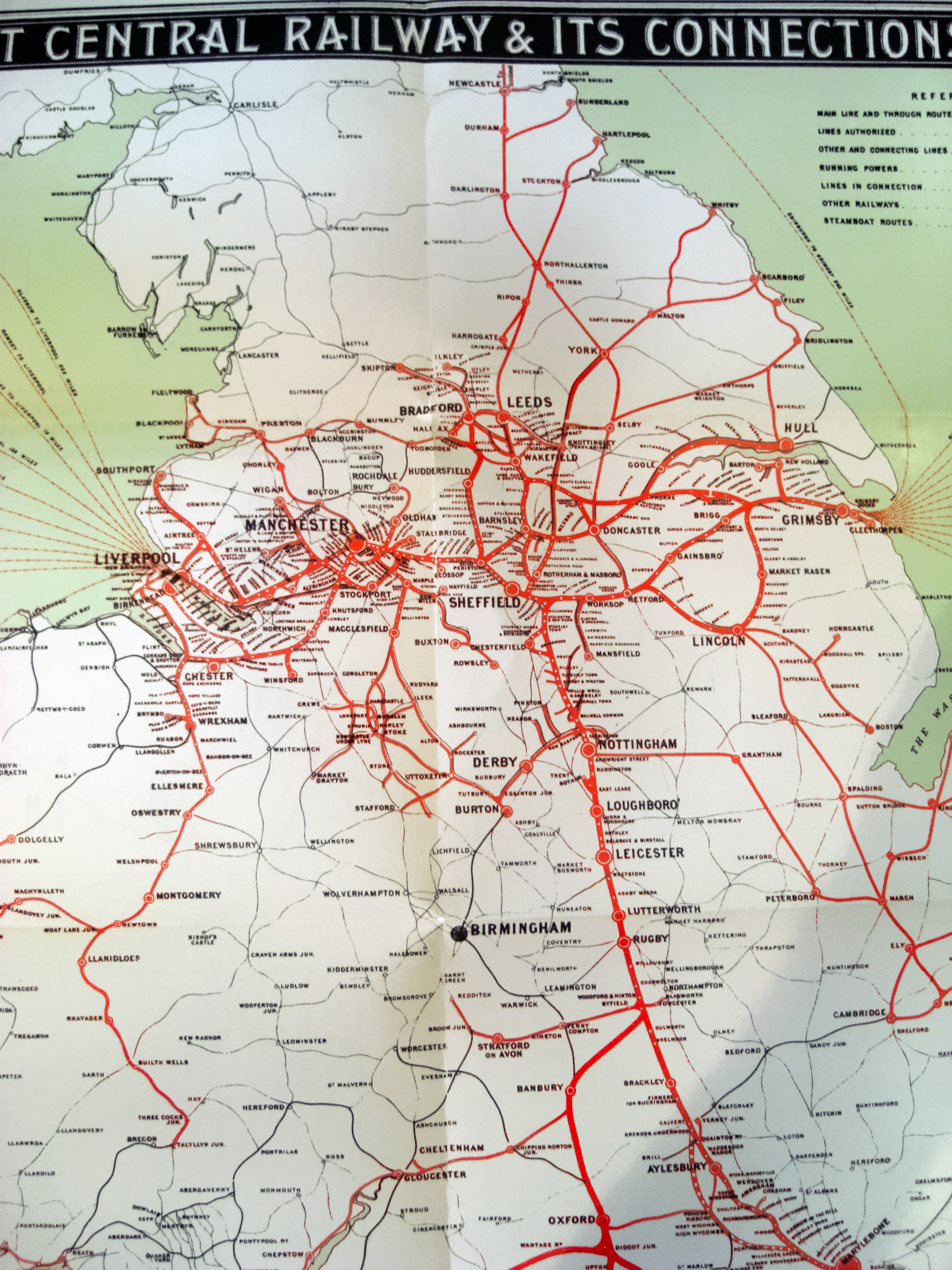
The Great Central Main Line in 1903. Aylesbury can be seen as a junction for the Wycombe Railway

The London extension was planned to European standards and had virtually no sharp corners or steep inclines. There was to be no level crossings- everything was carried above or below the railway. Work began in 1894 still under the MS&LR name. The estimated coast was approximately £3 million and would take four years to complete; the project being in two halves, the southern section running from Rugby in Warwickshire to Quainton Road which was the Metropolitan Railway's junction for Brill and Verney Junction. From there, trains would share tracks with the Met to a new terminus at Marylebone in London. The line officially opened on 9 March 1899, although the first passenger service did not run until 16 March. The GCR main line was the last main line to be completed in Britain until the Channel Tunnel Rail Link over a century later in 2003.

Although the GCR route of 1899 was the last Victorian main line to be built, one last railway line was to be built in Buckinghamshire. The Great Western and Great Central Joint Railway was a joint venture between the GWR and GCR. It was of use to the Great Western Railway as it provided a shorter route between London Paddington and Birmingham as opposed to the much longer route via Reading and Oxford. It also provided the Great Central Railway of a route by-passing the lines shared with the Metropolitan railway. Authorised in 1898, the actual joint line ran from Northolt Junction in Middlesex to Ashenden Junction in Buckinghamshire. At Northolt, the GWR route from Paddington (splitting at Old Oak Common Junction from the GWR main line) and the GCR route from Marylebone (splitting at Neasden Junction from the GCR main line) joined at a flying junction. From there the joint line entered Buckinghamshire and met the GWR 'Wycombe Railway' at High Wycombe railway station. The line then followed the route of the Wycombe Railway as far as Princes Risborough. It then preceded north-west towards Ashenden Junction, where the GWR and GCR split, the Great Western continuing through Bicester to join the existing Oxford-Birmingham line at Aynho Junction. The Great Central went northward, re-joining the main line at Grendon Underwood. The line opened in 1906 and involved considerable improvements to the existing section of the GWR 'Wycombe Railway' between High Wycombe and Princes Risborough including double track throughout and a new tunnel.

=== The Big Four ===
Between 1906 and 1936, the railway system of Buckinghamshire was at its largest. Up to 1922, it was operated by five companies, the LNWR, the LSWR, the GWR, the GCR and the Metropolitan Railway.

The First World War saw the government take over control of the railway network, leading to calls for nationalisation of the railways. Both the Conservative government and the railway companies rejected the idea. A compromise was reached in the form of the Railways Act 1921, also known as the Grouping Act, which grouped all the existing companies into four new companies, known as the Big Four. Due to its position, Buckinghamshire was one of few counties to be served by all four. The act came into operation in 1923.

==== London, Midland and Scottish Railway ====
The LMS took over the London and North Western Railway, serving the West Coast Main Line. As it absorbed all of the LNWRs lines, it ran over the Buckinghamshire Railway and the Cheddington to Aylesbury Line.

==== Great Western Railway ====
The GWR was the only member of the Big Four to retain its pre-grouping identity. It operated the Great Western Main Line, as well as the Slough to Windsor & Eton Line and Wycombe Railway.

==== London and North Eastern Railway ====
The LNER took over running of the Great Central Railway over the Great Central Main Line.

==== Southern Railway ====
The SR took over operation of the London & South Western Railway, hence the only line run by the company in Buckinghamshire was the Staines to Windsor Line.

=== Towards nationalisation, privatisation and HS2 ===
The Big Four ran the railways for twenty-five years. The 1920s and 1930s saw for the first time competition from the motor car. High unemployment after the First World War had caused the government to give money to county councils to improve the road network. The cash inflow allowed a large increase in car ownership and road mileage. The railways were still popular however and in 1930, the Staines to Windsor Line, run by the SR became the first railway in Buckinghamshire to be electrified, on the 660 V third rail system. During the Second World War, the railways suffered heavy damage due to bombing by the Luftwaffe. Little money was invested into the railways and maintenance was not carried out. At the end of the war in 1945, the new labour government realised that the private sector could no longer afford the railway system and so in 1947, the Transport Act 1947 was passed, which nationalised almost all forms of mass transit in the United Kingdom from 1 January 1948.

Nationalisation divided the railways into six state-owned regions, operated by British Rail. (Note: The original text for the Transport Act, 1947 can be found here) Those covering Buckinghamshire were:

- the Western region, which took over all GWR routes in the county
- the Southern region, which took over routes from SR
- the London Midland region which took over routes from the LMS.
- the Eastern region which took over routes from the LNER

The Beeching report saw closure of the former Great Central line north of Aylesbury (1966), and the Oxford-Bletchley 'Varsity Line' closed in 1967 (despite escaping listing by Beeching). Almost all other surviving stations and branch and connecting lines in the north of the county were also closed to passengers. But most lines in the south survived as busy London commuter routes, and new stations subsequently opened at Milton Keynes new town on the West Coast Main Line (1982); and at Haddenham & Thame Parkway (1987).

Privatisation in the 1990s placed most Bucks services under the Chiltern Railways franchise, one of the most innovative of the new companies.

In 2010 Chiltern opened Aylesbury Vale Parkway two miles northwest of Aylesbury; and Chiltern announced that in 2013 they would start a fast Marylebone-Oxford service via Wycombe, Risborough and a new Bicester chord. In 2011 the government announced financial support for re-opening of Aylesbury and Oxford to Milton Keynes/Bedford services, with new stations at Winslow and perhaps Newton Longville, using parts of the former Varsity and Great Central lines. Controversial proposals for High Speed 2, the new 230 mph high-speed line under the Chilterns and via the Great Central corridor, were announced by the Labour government in 2010, then enthusiastically taken up by the incoming Coalition despite strong opposition along parts of the route. The current plan is for opening in 2025, but without stations in Bucks.

== Bibliography ==
- Wade-Matthews, Max, ed. (1999). The World's Great Railway Journeys. Oxford: Sebastian Kelly. ISBN 1-84081-126-9. OCLC 154811186.
