= Long Marston, Hertfordshire =

Village in Hertfordshire, England

Coordinates: 51.83089°N 0.69593°W

Long Marston
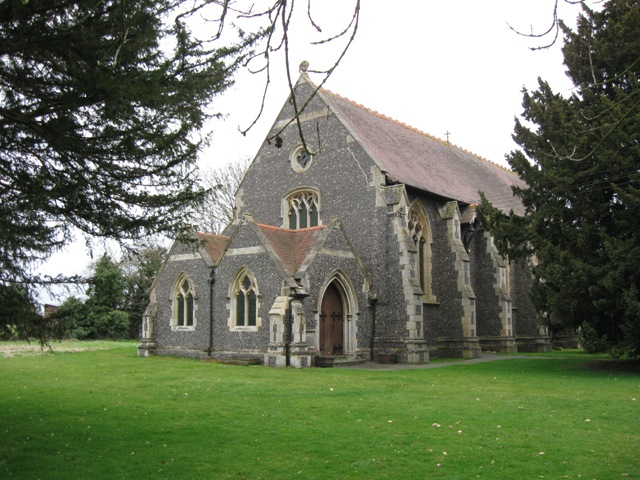
- All Saints Church

- Location within Hertfordshire
- OS grid reference: SP899155
- District: Dacorum
- Shire county: Hertfordshire
- Region: East
- Country: England
- Sovereign state: United Kingdom
- Post town: Tring
- Postcode district: HP23
- Dialling code: 01296
- Police: Hertfordshire
- Fire: Hertfordshire
- Ambulance: East of England
- UK Parliament: South West Hertfordshire

Long Marston is a small village to the north of Tring in Hertfordshire, in the Tring Rural parish council area. It is in the Borough of Dacorum, Tring West and Rural Ward. It is located roughly 5 miles east of Aylesbury and 11 miles north-west of Hemel Hempstead.

== Toponymy ==
The name of the village is likely to derive from 'Mershton', literally Marsh Farm, a reference to its propensity for flooding. By 1751 this had developed into the name Long Marcon

== History ==
"Straggling crossroads place stuck in the dullish, well-watered flatlands north of Tring. The ruined, ivy-covered flint tower is all that remains of a deserted medieval church - a must for the modern-day follower of the Tour of Dr Syntax (Rowlandson). A new church, uninspired in itself, incorporates fragments of the old - chancel arch and windows - and also the Perpendicular aisle piers from Tring parish church. In the main street are plain cottages, a bit of timber-framing and weather-boarding in good harmony. Some thoughtless new development. "In 1751 the village pond was the scene of England's last witch-lynching, when Ruth Osborn, the 'witch', was captured and drowned. One of her tormentors ended up gibbeted at Gubblecote Cross (1/2 m. E.), close to the moated site of a deserted medieval village." [From Hertfordshire (a Shell Guide), R. M. Healey, Faber & Faber, London, 1982]

In 1751 it is claimed that elderly husband and wife John and Ruth Osborne were both lynched. However it is highly debatable whether this lynching actually happened in Long Marston and it is widely believed that it actually occurred in the village of Wilstone.

Discovered in the 1920s from aerial photography there are three deserted medieval village - Boarscroft, Alnwick and Tiscot.

== Transport ==
Long Marston is about 2.5 miles (4 km) from Cheddington Railway Station and 5 miles from the A41. There is a bus service for the village - the No. 62 Aylesbury to Cheddington & Wilstone.

Marston Gate railway station to the north of the village was a stop on the Cheddington to Aylesbury branch line. The station opened in November 1860 and closed on 2 February 1953. In 1864, at a cost of £283, a booking office and stationmaster's house were constructed. Goods handled by the station include coal, milk, cattle and chaff from Aylesbury Brewery to feed the local cattle. As the station was in a particularly remote location, there was a wagonette service.

== Dean Bros ==
Dean Bros (later known as Deans Farm Eggs) was a family business and major employer in Long Marston, at one stage employing over 100 people in the community.

William Dean founded the business, starting with a pony and cart, collecting eggs in baskets from nearby farms and distributing these to local customers. William's son, Don later joined the business where they established a purpose built 'egg packing station' in the middle of Long Marston.

Don's brother, Len, who lived in Aston Clinton, also joined the family business. It was Len who really expanded the business with his contacts in London and a new packing station was constructed in Gubblecote. The business was firmly entrenched in village life, distributing school dinners cooked in the canteen of Long Marston School to the other villages in the parish.

== Education ==
Long Marston is also host to a primary school, Long Marston JMI. The original school, built during the Victorian era, was bombed on 13 January 1941 most likely because the village is very near to Cheddington Airfield which was in use during the Second World War. Infant Mistress Ruth Whelan lived behind the school and died in the tragedy. No pupils died and teaching resumed with a new infant teacher and the pupils spread between three different locations; infants to the Baptist Chapel, Juniors to the Old Parish Room in Puttenham and Seniors to Long Marston Parish Hall.

The current school, built in 1951, has gradually grown and extended with the village and its population.

== Amenities ==
In 1936 the Long Marston Recreation Ground was bought from the Rothschild Family for £30, the money raised from local residents after the Parish Council declined the offer. The ground has a purpose built BMX track as well as a play area and plays host to local football matches and the annual village show.

There is a plot of allotments available to rent form the Parish to the north of the village along Potash Lane. An important butterfly sanctuary called Millhoppers Pasture sits between Long Marston and Wilstone.

Due to transport links improving and more people owning cars, the number of services in Long Marston has slowly diminished. One public house remains, the Queens Head. Historically there were four. The White Hart and the Rose and Crown shut many years ago, but the Boot was a recent loss and quite a severe one for village life as the local shop and Post Office had been relocated there. Now the nearest Post Office is in Wingrave and stores are at Wilstone, Cheddington or Tring.

=== All Saints Church ===
All Saints Church comes under the Tring Team Parish which is the Church of England in Tring, Aldbury, Long Marston, Wilstone and Puttenham. The original church was abandoned in 1883 after it was deemed to be unsafe due to use of unseasoned oak in the roof and saturation of the foundations by water from lack of guttering. Apart from the old church tower which still stands today the rest of the building was demolished. A new church was built with stone in a Gothic style, using parts of the old church, to the north of the village on higher ground which has less of a propensity for flooding. The land was given by the Rothschild Family and the new church built at a cost of £4000. The church was left unfinished until 1888 due to lack of funds.

=== Victory Hall ===
The original Long Marston Parish Hall occupied a site further up Station Road toward the newly built church. It was originally Hastoe village hall which was moved to the site in the early 1900s and of timber construction. The site was converted into dwellings in the early 1960s and renovated again in the mid 1990s. The new Victory Hall opened in 1956 after 10 years of fundraising and sits on the entrance to the recreation ground. It is host to the annual village Pantomime which first started in 1987.

== Sport ==
=== Long Marston Cricket Club ===
The village is home to Long Marston Cricket Club, formed in 1867 and one of the most affluent village cricket clubs in the Hertfordshire and Buckinghamshire region. The club attracts players of all ages from across the two counties, with many junior teams as well three senior teams which play on Saturdays throughout the summer. There is also a Sunday team that play primarily at home. The club originally played on a coconut mat placed over a concrete strip in the middle of the current recreation ground then moved to the 'Marlins' site in 1963 which was originally allotments, 6 acres in size, near square and completely flat. The site was bought from the Vicarage for £400 with uproar in the village because of the loss of the allotments.

=== Long Marston Tennis Club ===
Long Marston Tennis Club was formed in 1960 using a single court on the recreation ground. In 1978 the club moved next to the cricket club and in 1983 gained a club house which burnt down in 1992 and was rebuilt 2 years later.

=== Long Marston Football Club ===
Long Marston Football Club was formed in the 1890s and shared the recreation ground with the cricket club up until the cricketers moved to the Marlins ground in 1963.

Long Marston FC had won the Aylesbury and District First Division League title twice in the late 1950s and the Herts Junior Cup in 1962; these days the club's first eleven is still in the League's top division, in a mid table position. More recent achievements have been the First Division title in 2003 and the Oving Cup (for local village teams) five years ago.
