= Cheddington =

Village and civil parish in England

Coordinates: 51.847°N 0.664°W

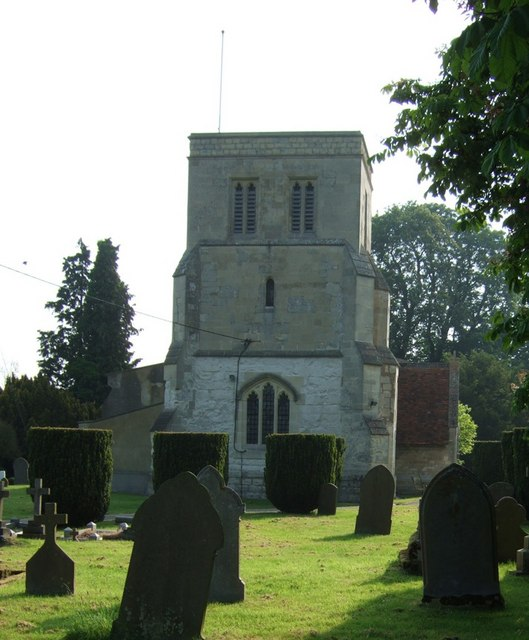
- St. Giles' parish church tower

- Location within Buckinghamshire
- Population: 1,754 (2011 Census)
- OS grid reference: SP9217
- Civil parish: Cheddington
- Unitary authority: Buckinghamshire
- Ceremonial county: Buckinghamshire
- Region: South East
- Country: England
- Sovereign state: United Kingdom
- Post town: Leighton Buzzard
- Postcode district: LU7
- Dialling code: 01296
- Police: Thames Valley
- Fire: Buckinghamshire
- Ambulance: South Central
- UK Parliament: Aylesbury
- Website: Cheddington Village website

Cheddington is a village and civil parish in the Buckinghamshire district of the ceremonial county of Buckinghamshire, England. The parish has an area of 1,429 acres (578 ha).

The village is about 6 miles northeast of Aylesbury and three miles north of Tring in Hertfordshire. The hamlet of Cooks Wharf has grown up where the main road into the village from Pitstone crosses the Grand Union Canal.

== Archaeology ==
At Southend Hill near the village are the remains of an Iron Age hill fort which has been largely obliterated through arable cultivation.

== History ==
The earliest known record of the village is in the Domesday Book of 1086, in which it is called Cetendone, which is Old English for "Cetta's Hill". The Church of England parish church of Saint Giles was originally Norman. There is also a Methodist church with a large congregation.

Cheddington manor house is a much gabled and half-timbered red-brick building under a tiled roof, dating from the 16th century.

In 1963 Cheddington featured in the national press as it was near the location of the Great Train Robbery of 1963 at Bridego Railway Bridge in the hamlet of Ledburn.

In 1984, Cheddington received national notoriety as the location of the first assault by Malcolm Fairley, a violent armed rapist, nicknamed "The Fox" because of his cunning nocturnal attacks.

Since 1981 the village, due to its railway station and easy access to four towns, has more than quadrupled in size.

In 2005 Cheddington won the Buckinghamshire Best Kept Village Competition DeFraine Cup and also the Buckinghamshire Village of the Year Competition. It went on to win the East of England Young People award in the national competition. Cheddington also won the smaller villages category in the 2006 and 2007 Buckinghamshire Village of the Year Competition and received a special community building award.

== Amenities ==
The village has two public houses: The Old Swan, a thatched inn, and The Three Horseshoes. A third inn, known as the Rosebery Arms, designed by the Victorian architect George Devey has been converted into houses.

Cheddington Combined School is a mixed community primary school that takes children between the ages of four and 11. The school has about 200 pupils, and its catchment area includes the neighbouring parishes of Horton and Slapton.

Cheddington has various clubs including a a bell ringers' association, a history society, a football team and badminton, tennis, bowls and petanque clubs.

== Transport ==
Cheddington railway station, located approximately 1 kilometre (0.62 mi) to the north of the village, is served by London Northwestern Railway services between London Euston and Milton Keynes Central. The station opened in 1838 as Aylesbury Junction. The Cheddington to Aylesbury Line, which formerly ran between Cheddington and Aylesbury High Street, closed in 1963.
