= Marston Gate railway station =

Former railway station in Hertfordshire, England

Coordinates: 51.841860°N 0.715668°W

Marston Gate

General information
- Location: Long Marston, Dacorum; England
- Platforms: 1

Other information
- Status: Disused

History
- Original company: London and Birmingham Railway (Aylesbury)
- Pre-grouping: London and North Western Railway
- Post-grouping: London Midland and Scottish Railway; London Midland Region of British Railways

Key dates
- 1860: Opened
- 2 February 1953: Closed to passengers
- 2 December 1963: Closed to freight
Location

Marston Gate Railway station was a station on the London and North Western Railway - Aylesbury Branch serving the nearby village of Long Marston, Hertfordshire. The station was the only intermediate stop on the line, which ran to Cheddington where it met with the main line.

== History ==
The main use of Marston Gate was for transportation of Milk, Cattle and Manure, and it was recorded that in the early 1900s around 50 milk churns were loaded at this station every day - heading for the Nestlé factory in Aylesbury. Fruit from the orchards in the local area was also transported from the station.

The station saw passenger use from its opening until 1953 when a bus service was introduced and took over from the line, although it was still used for rail freight; the line closed completely in 1963.

== Routes ==
The trains calling at this station would go to Cheddington or Aylesbury

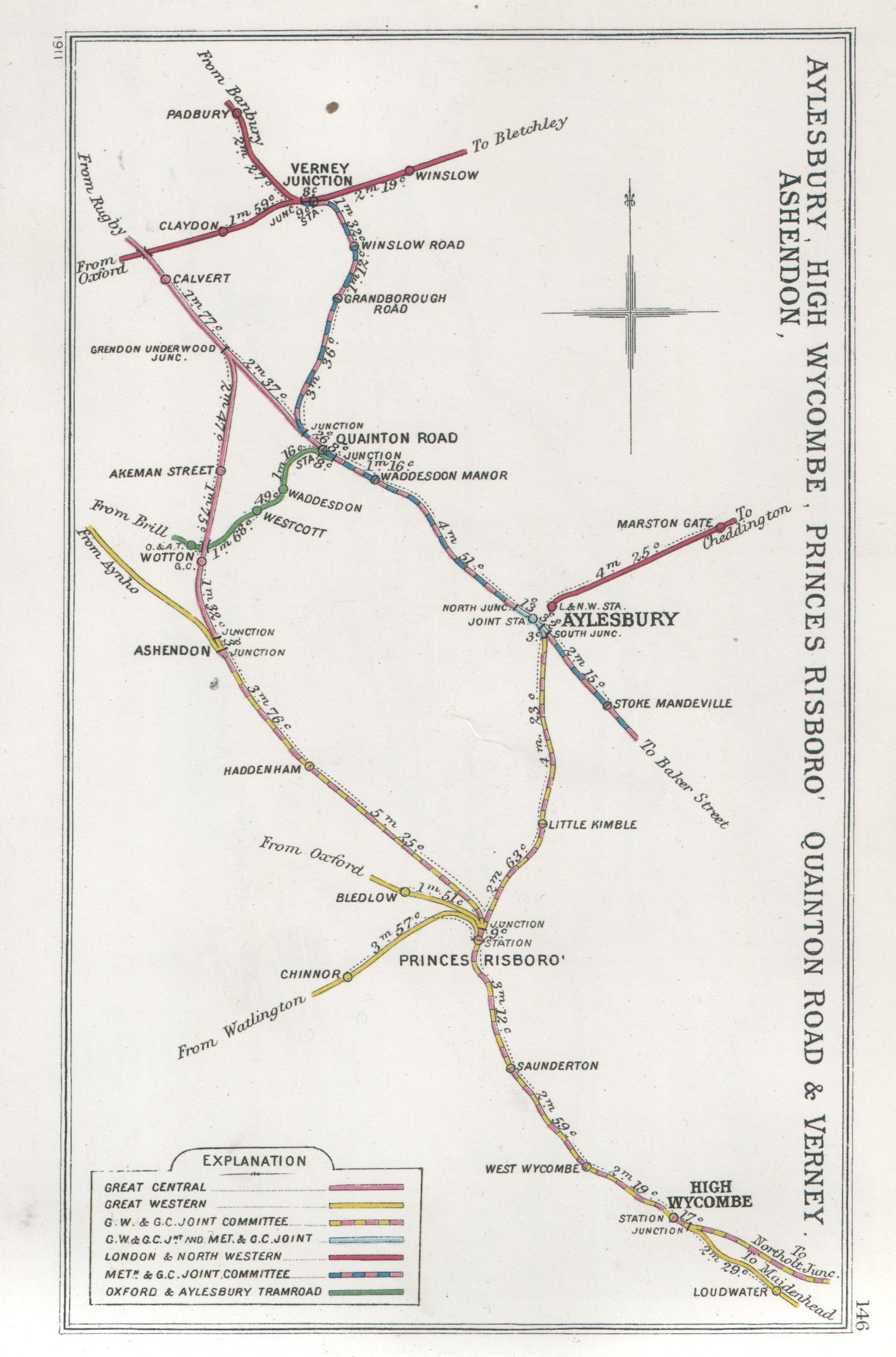
A 1911 Railway Clearing House map of railways in the vicinity of Aylesbury

Preceding station	Disused railways	Following station
Cheddington	London and North Western Railway; Aylesbury Branch	Aylesbury High Street

== Today ==
As of December 2018, the station house is still in existence - albeit rebuilt and for use as a private house. The road to Long Marston is still called Station Road.

== Sources ==
- Long Marston Website - village history
- Station on navigable O.S. map
