= Tring Rural =

Civil parish in Hertfordshire, England

Coordinates: 51.83278°N 0.69895°W

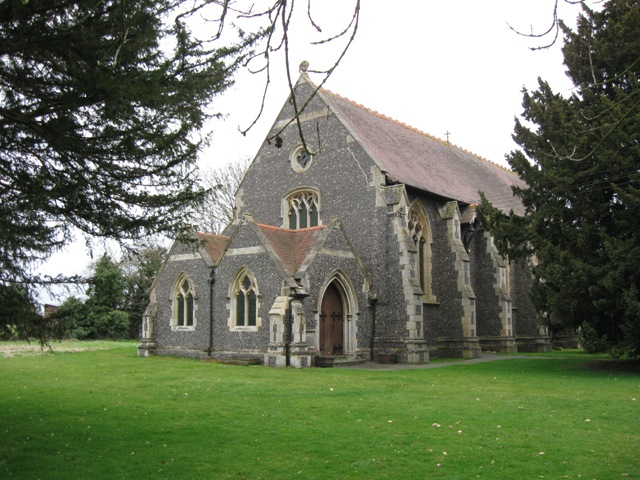
- All Saints Church, Long Marston

- Location within Hertfordshire
- Population: 1,390 (2011 Census)
- OS grid reference: SP897157
- District: Dacorum
- Shire county: Hertfordshire
- Region: East
- Country: England
- Sovereign state: United Kingdom
- Post town: Tring
- Postcode district: HP23
- Police: Hertfordshire
- Fire: Hertfordshire
- Ambulance: East of England
- UK Parliament: South West Hertfordshire

Tring Rural is a civil parish in the Dacorum district, in the county of Hertfordshire, England. It includes the villages of Long Marston, Wilstone, Puttenham, and the hamlets of Gubblecote and Astrope. It is largely situated to the northwest of the town of Tring. The town of Tring itself is not part of the parish. At the 2011 Census the population of the civil parish was 1,390.

The ancient parish of Tring covered an extensive rural area as well as the town itself. The Tring Local Government District was created in 1859 covering the built-up area of the town, but the local government district did not cover the whole parish of Tring. Under the Local Government Act 1894, local government districts became urban districts, and parishes which were part inside and part outside an urban district, such as Tring, had to be split into separate parishes. The parts of the old parish of Tring outside the urban district therefore became the parish of Tring Rural.

The first parish meeting for Tring Rural was held on 4 December 1894 at Long Marston, when nominations for the new parish council were made. An election followed on 17 December 1894, and the parish council came into office on 31 December 1894. The council held its first meeting on 2 January 1895 at Long Marston.

The parish was enlarged on 1 April 1964, when the neighbouring Puttenham civil parish was abolished and its area absorbed into Tring Rural.

Tring Rural Parish Council holds its meetings alternately at Wilstone Village Hall, Victory Hall in Long Marston, and Cecilia Hall in Puttenham.
