= Puttenham, Hertfordshire =

Village in Hertfordshire, England

Coordinates: 51.82298°N 0.71298°W

Puttenham
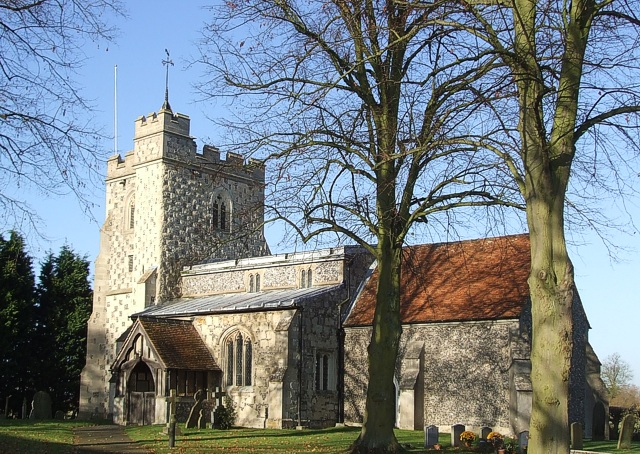
- Church of St Mary, Puttenham

- Location within Hertfordshire
- OS grid reference: SP888146
- Civil parish: Tring Rural
- District: Dacorum
- Shire county: Hertfordshire
- Region: East
- Country: England
- Sovereign state: United Kingdom
- Post town: Tring
- Postcode district: HP23
- Dialling code: 01296
- Police: Hertfordshire
- Fire: Hertfordshire
- Ambulance: East of England
- UK Parliament: South West Hertfordshire

Puttenham is a village in the civil parish of Tring Rural, in the Dacorum borough of Hertfordshire, England.

It was recorded as ‘Puteham’ in the Domesday Book.

St Mary's Church, the Church of England parish church, has a nave and aisles dating from the early 14th-century, and an elaborate roof and west tower from the 15th-century. It is a Grade I listed building.

Puttenham is one of the 51 Thankful Villages in England and Wales that suffered no fatalities during the Great War of 1914 to 1918. The village is featured on Darren Hayman's album, Thankful Villages Volume 1.

Puttenham was historically a parish. The civil parish was abolished in 1964 and absorbed into the neighbouring parish of Tring Rural (which had been created in 1894 from the parts of the old parish of Tring outside the Tring urban district). At the 1961 census (the last before the abolition of the parish), Puttenham had a population of 107.
