= Aylesbury High Street railway station =

Disused railway station in Aylesbury, Buckinghamshire

Coordinates: 51.81678°N 0.80717°W

Aylesbury High Street
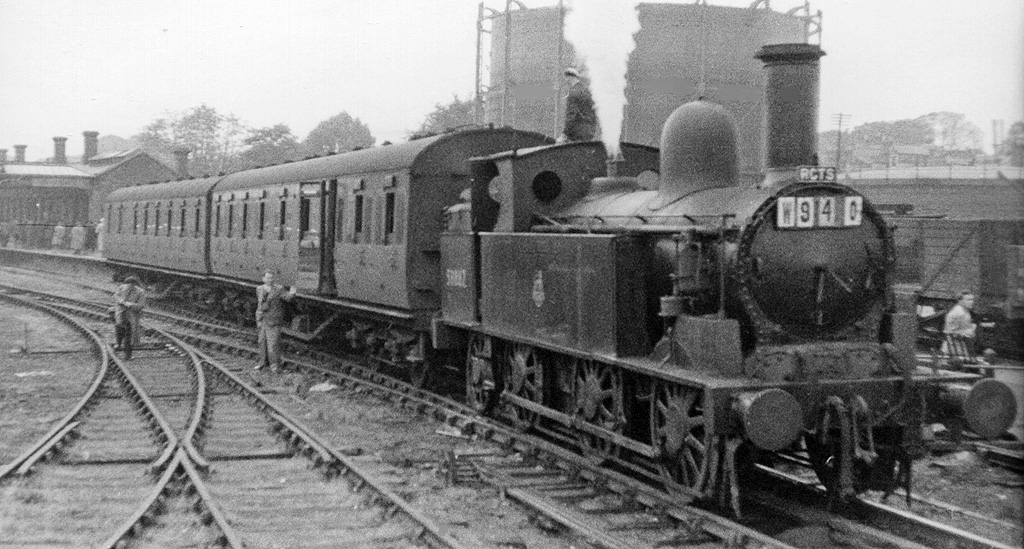
- Aylesbury High Street Station in 1953

General information
- Location: Aylesbury, Buckinghamshire; England
- Platforms: 1

Other information
- Status: Disused

History
- Original company: London and Birmingham Railway (Aylesbury)
- Pre-grouping: London and North Western Railway
- Post-grouping: London Midland and Scottish Railway; London Midland Region of British Railways

Key dates
- 10 June 1839: First station opens
- 16 June 1889: Replaced by second station
- 25 September 1950: Renamed Aylesbury High Street
- 2 February 1953: Closed to passengers
- 2 December 1963: Closed to freight
Location

Aylesbury High Street railway station was the London and North Western Railway station which served the town of Aylesbury in the English county of Buckinghamshire. It was the terminus of a branch from Cheddington on what is now known as the West Coast Main Line running to London Euston and to Birmingham New Street and further north.

Two stations were built, the first being used as a goods terminus after its closure to passengers.

== History ==
The first station at Aylesbury was opened by the Aylesbury Railway on 10 June 1839; this was closed on 16 June 1889 when it was replaced by the second station, also named Aylesbury. The line was operated by the London and Birmingham Railway, and when that company amalgamated with others to form the London and North Western Railway (LNWR), the Aylesbury Railway was absorbed by the LNWR. The LNWR became part of the London Midland and Scottish Railway during the Grouping of 1923, passing on to the London Midland Region of British Railways during the nationalisation of 1948. British Railways (BR) renamed the station Aylesbury High Street on 25 September 1950; it was then closed to passengers on 2 February 1953 and then freight on 2 December 1963.

== Routes ==
The only intermediate station between Aylesbury and Cheddington was at Marston Gate.

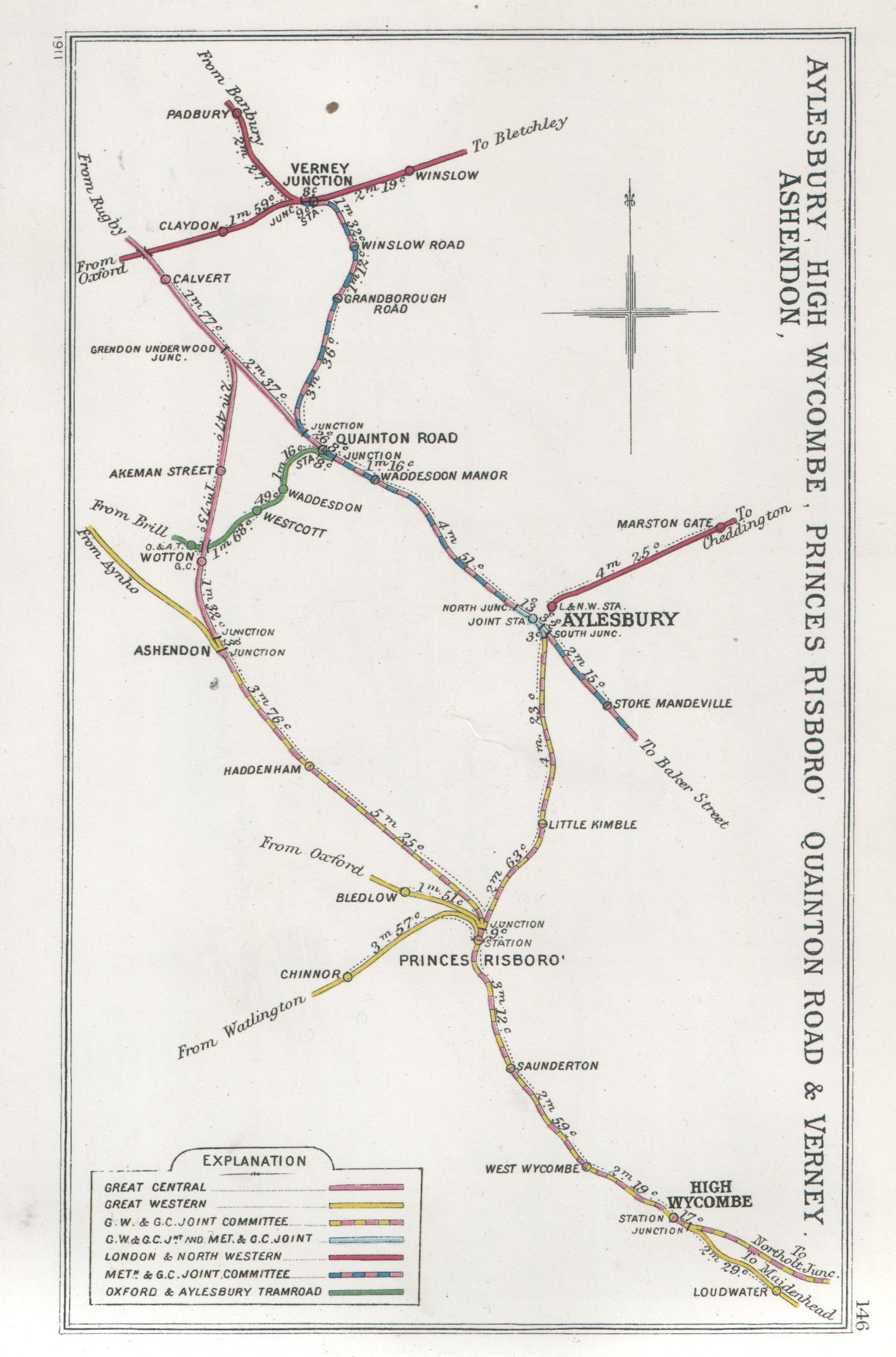
A 1911 Railway Clearing House map of railways in the vicinity of Aylesbury

Preceding station	Disused railways	Following station
Marston Gate	London and North Western Railway; Aylesbury Branch	Terminus

== The site today ==
The site is now occupied by an office block and a retail park. The route into Aylesbury has been taken over by a road named 'Stocklake' and 'Vale Park Drive' (part of the A418 road), although the formation remains mostly intact along the route of the road. During the summer of 2015 trees and vegetation were cleared from the formation in preparation for the construction of a new Stocklake (urban) road. On Monday 18 January 2016, contractors began work on the new road, which will use the trackbed of the old railway to link Park Street with Douglas Road, Aylesbury, parallel to the existing road. This will be converted into a new service road for homes and businesses, providing more parking and easier access.

== Sources ==
- Butt, R. V. J. (October 1995). The Directory of Railway Stations: details every public and private passenger station, halt, platform and stopping place, past and present (1st ed.). Sparkford: Patrick Stephens Ltd. ISBN 978-1-85260-508-7. OCLC 60251199. OL 11956311M.
- Jowett, Alan (2000). Jowett's Nationalised Railway Atlas (1st ed.). Penryn, Cornwall: Atlantic Transport Publishers. ISBN 978-0-906899-99-1. OCLC 228266687.
- Jowett, Alan (March 1989). Jowett's Railway Atlas of Great Britain and Ireland: From Pre-Grouping to the Present Day (1st ed.). Sparkford: Patrick Stephens Ltd. ISBN 978-1-85260-086-0. OCLC 22311137.
- Station on navigable O.S. map
