= Cheddington to Aylesbury Line =

Railway line in England

The Cheddington to Aylesbury Line was an early railway branch line, opening in 1839. It was promoted by local people who formed the Aylesbury Railway to construct it, and it made a junction with the London and Birmingham Railway at Cheddington. That company worked the branch line, and when the L&BR merged with others in 1846 to form the London and North Western Railway, the line was in effect the Aylesbury branch of the LNWR.

It was important to Aylesbury, securing it a cheaper way of bringing in essentials and sending out its agricultural produce, as well as greatly improving passenger communication. The early terminus at Aylesbury was relocated and expanded in 1889. However other railways were built serving Aylesbury, and in time these offered easier communication: the inconvenience of passenger travel involving changing trains at Cheddington made the branch line unattractive.

The passenger service was discontinued in 1953 and the line was closed completely in 1963.

== Origins ==
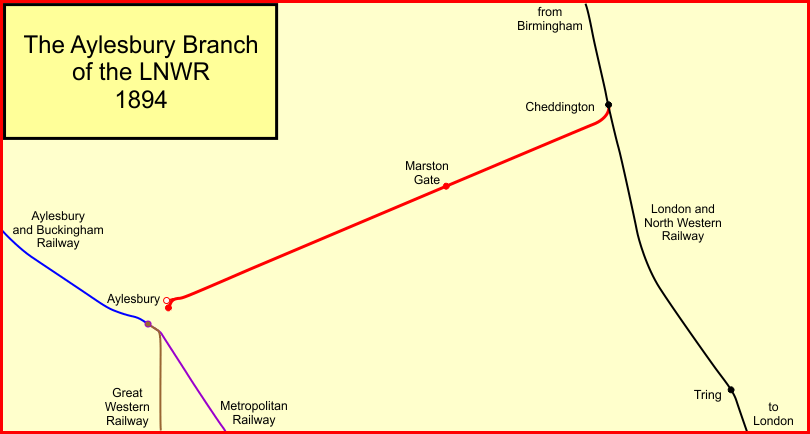
The Aylesbury Railway branch

The London and Birmingham Railway opened in stages, through Cheddington on 9 April 1838, and throughout on 17 September 1838. It formed, with the Grand Junction Railway, the backbone of early railways in Great Britain.

Aylesbury Railway Act 1836
- Act of Parliament
- Parliament of the United Kingdom
- Long title: An Act for making a Railway from Aylesbury to join the London and Birmingham Railway near the Village of Cheddington in the County of Buckingham.
- Citation: 6 & 7 Will. 4. c. xxxvii

Dates
- Royal assent: 19 May 1836

Text of statute as originally enacted

As the London and Birmingham line was being built, business interests in Aylesbury were already thinking of how a railway connection might be made between their town and the new railway. In 1815 the town had ensured its connection to the canal network for the transport to market of its agricultural produce, and now wished to do the same with a railway. In these early times, goods traffic was the dominant commercial force. Serious discussions took place over the construction of a branch line and a scheme went to the 1836 session of Parliament. The Aylesbury Railway Act 1836 (6 & 7 Will. 4. c. xxxvii) obtained royal assent on 19 May 1836, without opposition in Parliament.

All seemed to be going well, until a local bank, William Medley, Son and Company, of Aylesbury, failed in January 1837. (Note: In addition, the bank's official auditor appointed to quantify the loss absconded with £2,000 in cash.) The bank had been strong supporters of the line, and many local businesspeople were embarrassed, causing a local financial panic, and the loss of promised subscriptions to the railway. After urgent reflection, the Aylesbury Railway Company decided to proceed with its branch line, but any ideas it may have harboured regarding an extension on to Oxford, were now dismissed.

== Construction and opening ==
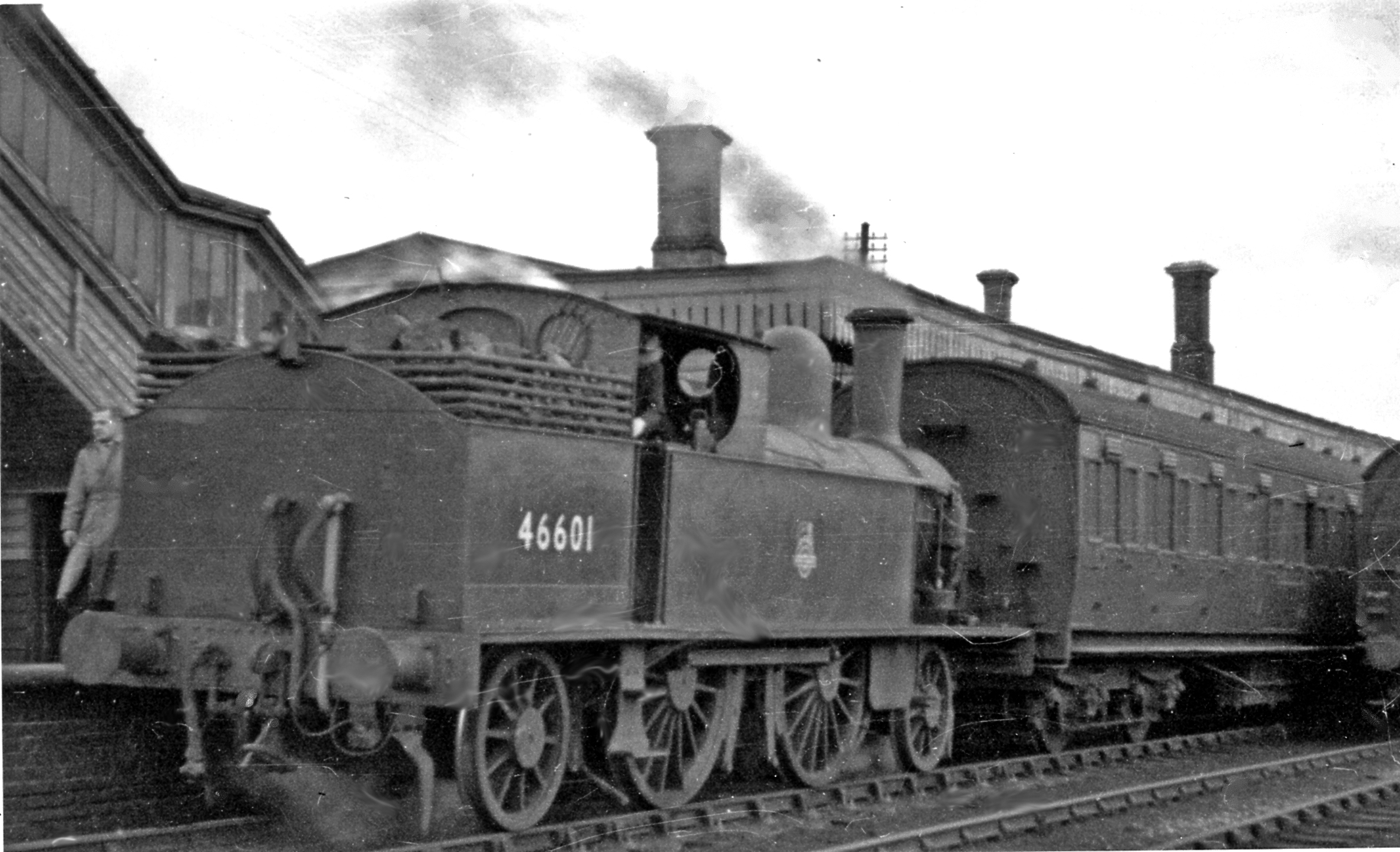
Aylesbury train at Cheddington on the Last Day

The first sod was cut in July 1838. The delay in starting was due to the banking crisis, but also to reconsideration as to the advisability of proceeding with a line to Oxford, and to the problem in negotiating a working arrangement with the London and Birmingham Railway. It was not until 14 December 1837 that the working agreement was finalised. Construction was easy, as the line was almost entirely straight and level, with no road or river bridges. Space was made for double track, but only a single line was laid. The work had been estimated at £50,000 and the actual cost was £59,000. This included land acquisition and Parliamentary expenses.

The construction was under the general direction of Robert Stephenson.

Whishaw described the line further:

The rails are chiefly of the parallel form [as opposed to fish-bellied]... they are in 16 feet lengths, and fixed in chairs by means of wooden keys; the chairs are placed 4 feet from centre to centre along the line of railway; the sleepers are from 9 to 10 feet in length, and of full scantling...

The station at Aylesbury is conveniently laid out: a triple way, connected, at a convenient distance from the offices, with the main line, runs into a railway-dock 33 feet wide at its entrance, and 12 feet at its connexion with the terminal turn-table, the side space of which is 4 feet 10 inches;... the quay [loading dock] on either side is about 10 feet in width. There is a carriage-dock 10 feet 8 inches in length, and 8 feet 10 inches wide, furnished at its entrance with a proper turn-table, and abutting on the yard, conveniently situate for the arrival of common-road vehicles... The booking-office and general waiting-room are in one; there is, however, a separate room for ladies. This is, upon the whole, one of the best-arranged stations for a short line of railway that we have any where met with. There is a locomotive engine-house at each end of the line; that at Aylesbury is about 100 feet in length, and 16 feet in clear width. On the top of this building is a capacious tank for water, for the supply of the locomotives.

The London and Birmingham Railway undertook to lease the line from 15 January 1840 for £2,500 per annum, that is to say 5% on the estimated construction cost. At the outset the L&BR had intended simply to own the track, and permit independent hauliers to operate on the line on a toll basis; however on reflection it was realised that this arrangement would hardly work for an intercity line like the L&BR, and the company decided to operate its own trains.

The Aylesbury Railway opened on 10 June 1839.

It was stated at a celebratory dinner later that "Prior to the railway opening the only means of travelling to London had been by coach which left Aylesbury at 6 o'clock in the morning arriving in London at 10 o'clock in the evening, 14 hours travelling. By use of the Aylesbury Railway this will now be two hours."

== In operation ==
An ordinary train service started the following day, 1 June; there were three trains on each weekday and two on Sundays, connecting with London trains at Cheddington. Goods trains began regular operation in November 1839.

London and Birmingham Railway (Aylesbury Railway) Act 1846
- Act of Parliament
- Parliament of the United Kingdom
- Long title: An Act for vesting the Aylesbury Railway in the London and Birmingham Railway Company.
- Citation: 9 & 10 Vict. c. clxxxii

Dates
- Royal assent: 16 July 1846

On 15 January 1845 the lease of the Aylesbury Railway expired, and on 16 July 1846 the London and Birmingham Railway became part of the new London and North Western Railway; the new company purchased the Aylesbury company for £60,000.

When the line was opened there were no intermediate stations, but a new stopping place at Marston Crossing was in use as early as 1857; nevertheless it was not until 1860 that it was recognised as a station proper and included in local timetables.

Quick adds detail about the early days of Cheddington: it was referred to in company timetables of 20 June 1839 as "the Aylesbury Junction"; then as Cheddington Junction in 1850. It was not shown in Bradshaw until 1844, when only southbound main line trains were shown. Some Aylesbury trains operated to and from Tring.

A form of absolute block working (Note: Presumably the train staff and ticket system with block instruments.) was brought into use on the branch on 18 November 1880.

== An improved terminus ==
The original terminus at Aylesbury was cramped and unsuitable for the growing volume of traffic; a new station fronting High Street at Aylesbury was opened on Sunday 16 June 1889; the old station (at Station Street) was transferred to use as a goods station.

The new passenger station did not have a run-round loop, and arriving passenger trains were generally run round by propelling them to the goods yard points to release the engine, and gravitating the coaches back to the platform under the control of the guard. In 1950 this procedure was rendered unnecessary with the introduction of push-and-pull trains, which did not require the engine to run round the train. Bletchley depot had three LMS push-and-pull sets, one for the Aylesbury line and one each for the Dunstable and Newport Pagnell lines.

After nationalisation of the railways in 1948, the other stations at Aylesbury came under British Railways management as well as the Cheddington line station, and a distinction in names was considered necessary. The goods station was renamed Aylesbury High Street from 1 July 1950, and the passenger station was similarly renamed from 25 September the same year.

== Decline ==
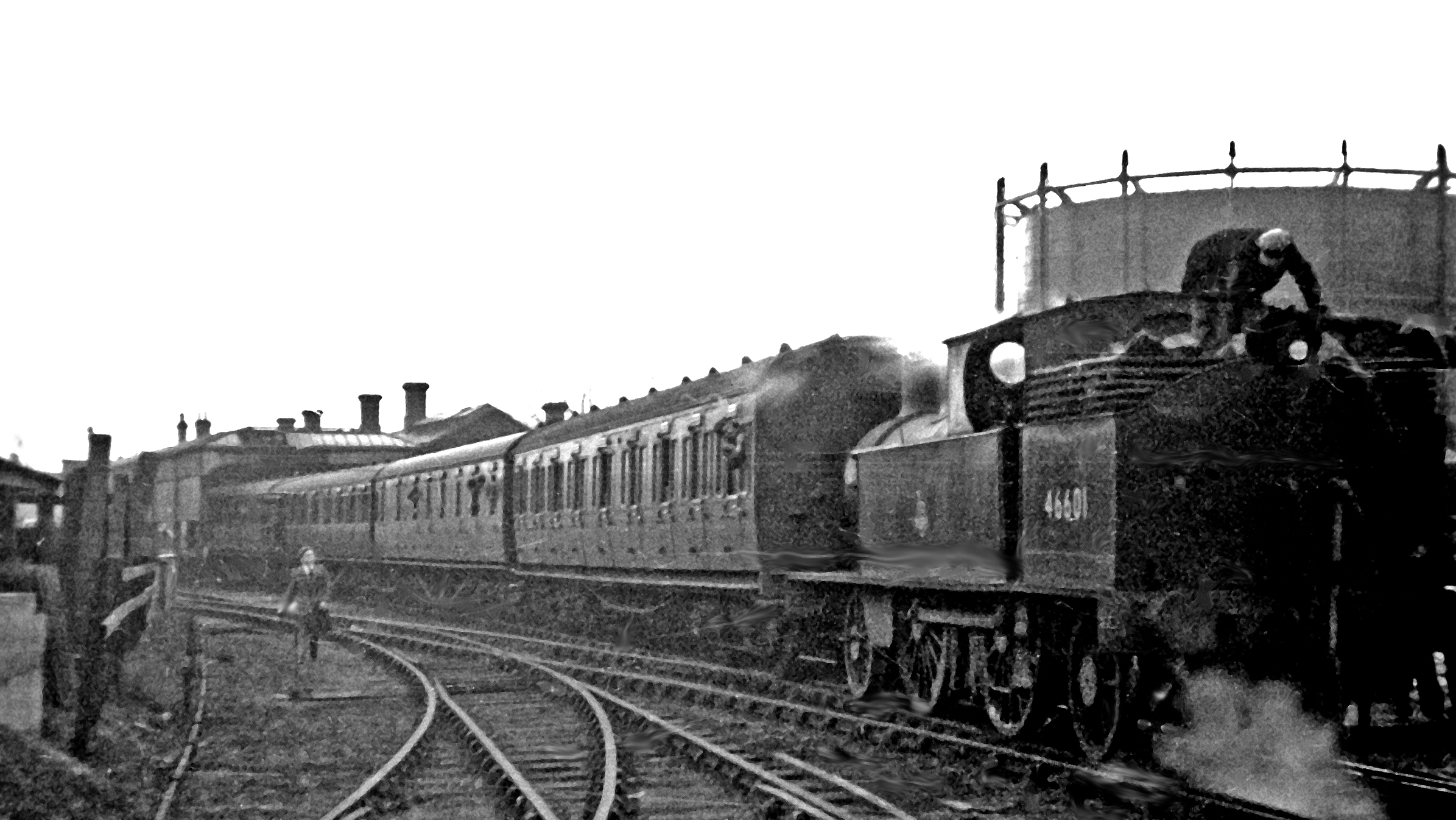
Last day of the Aylesbury branch

Throughout the twentieth century, the line had gradually lost business to more convenient railway routes; London could be reached direct by either of two other routes, and northward journeys were convenient by the Great Central Railway. In the winter of 1952-3 only four passenger trains ran each way on the branch, supplemented by one on Wednesdays and two on Saturdays. Except on Wednesdays and Saturdays the last train for Cheddington left Aylesbury at the early hour of 13:25 and made no London connection, for the branch had long ceased to be a useful route from Aylesbury to London.

The line closed 2 February 1953 to passengers. It continued in use for goods traffic until 2 December 1963.

== Location list ==
- Aylesbury; opened 10 June 1839; relocated 16 June 1889; renamed Aylesbury High Street 1950; (Note: Quick says that Bradshaw used the designation High Street, and earlier Station Street "much earlier".) closed 2 February 1953;
- Marston Gate; opened November 1860 (first time in timetables); closed 2 February 1953;
- Cheddington; main line station; opened 10 June 1839; still open.
