= Cheddington railway station =

Railway station in Buckinghamshire, England

Coordinates: 51°51′30″N 0°39′44″W

Cheddington
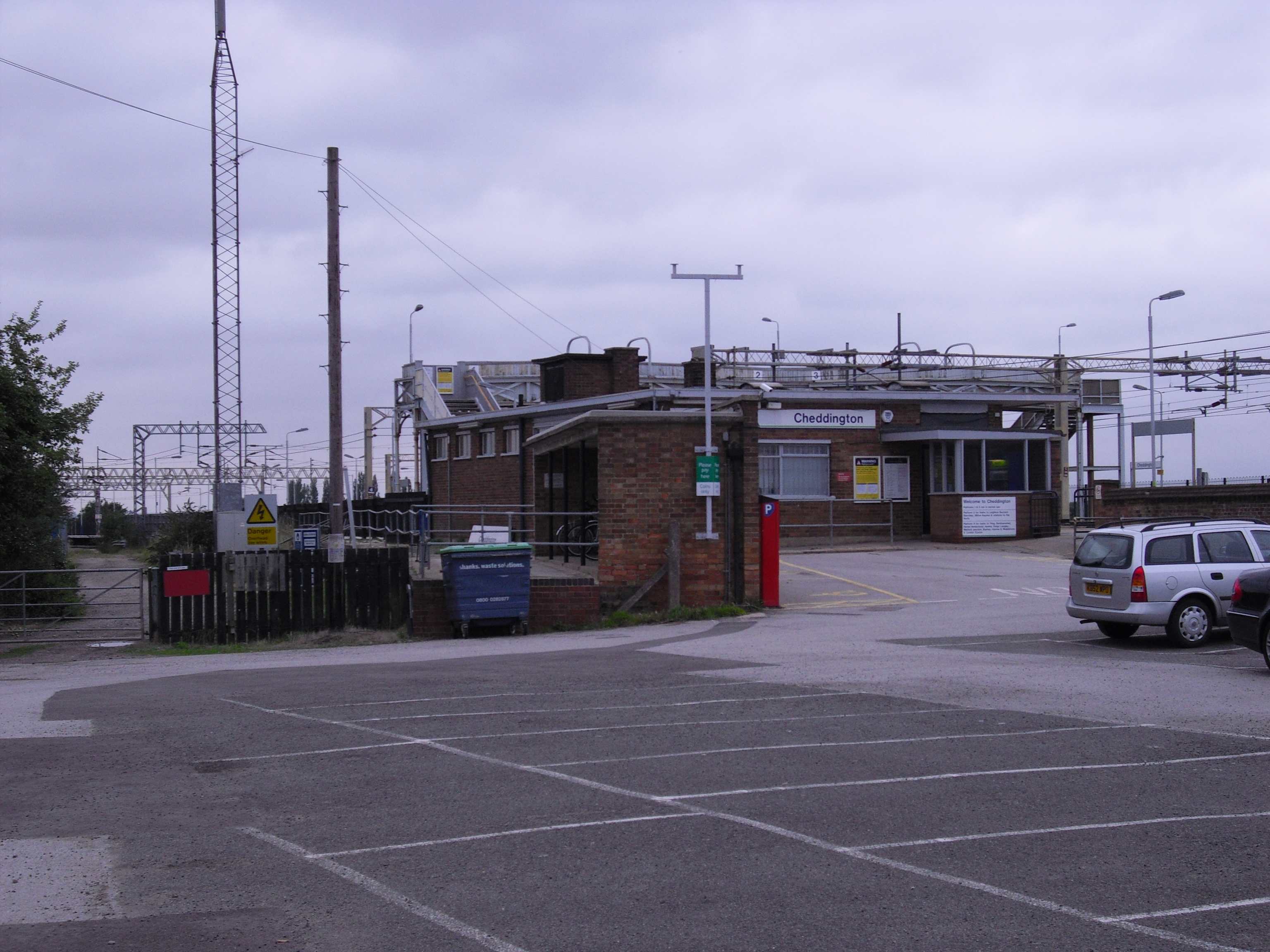

General information
- Location: Cheddington, Buckinghamshire; England
- Grid reference: SP922185
- Manager: London Northwestern Railway
- Platforms: 4

Other information
- Station code: CED
- Classification: DfT category F

Key dates
- 9 April 1838: Opened as Aylesbury Junction
- 1850: renamed Cheddington Junction
- 1870: renamed Cheddington
- 2 December 1963: Closed to freight

Passengers
- 2021/22: ▲32,180
- 2022/23: ▲48,014
- 2023/24: ▲68,066
- 2024/25: ▲83,010
- 2025/26: ▲85,034
Location
Notes
- Passenger statistics from the Office of Rail and Road

Cheddington railway station serves the village of Cheddington, in Buckinghamshire, England, and the surrounding town of Ivinghoe and the village of Mentmore. The station is 36 miles 8 chains (36.10 mi; 58.10 km) north west of London Euston on the West Coast Main Line. It is operated by London Northwestern Railway, which also provides all services.

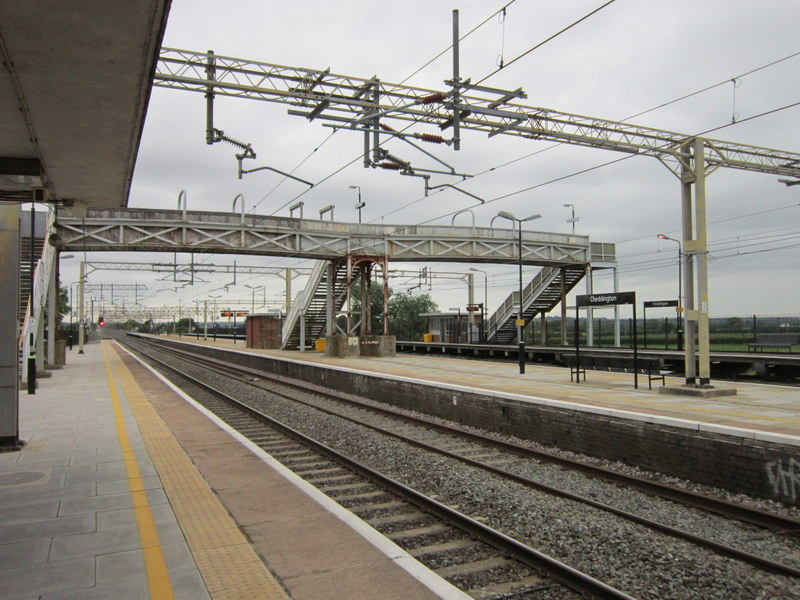
View northbound from Platform 1 in 2012

The station has four platforms, each with 12 carriage capacity, but only platforms 3 and 4 are used regularly and platforms 1 and 2 are used only during engineering works and disruption. Platforms 2 and 3 form a centre island. The main station buildings are located on Platform 1 adjacent to the car park. Access to the other platforms is gained by a footbridge.

The ticket office closed on 28 March 2013 and the station is now unstaffed. Although starting in December 2017 there is a security guard on the station around the clock, the ticket building is still closed.

Cheddington was formerly a junction for the London & North Western Railway's branch line to Aylesbury High Street. This branch terminated in the east of Aylesbury and made no connection to the GCR/Metropolitan Railway station in that town. The branch closed to passengers in 1953 but with freight services continuing until 1964. The trackless edge of the Aylesbury branch platform is still in evidence at Cheddington and part of the old track bed of the branch is now used as the station's approach road.

Just over 1.2 miles (2 km) north of this station, on the stretch of line between Cheddington and Leighton Buzzard, is Bridego Bridge, the scene of the Great Train Robbery of 1963.

== Services ==
All services at Cheddington are operated by London Northwestern Railway.

The typical off-peak service in trains per hour is:

- 2 tph to London Euston
- 2 tph to Milton Keynes Central

A very small number of early morning and late evening services are extended beyond Milton Keynes Central to and from Northampton and Birmingham New Street.

Preceding station	National Rail	Following station
Leighton Buzzard towards Milton Keynes Central	London Northwestern Railway London–Milton Keynes	Tring towards London Euston
Disused railways
Terminus	London and North Western Railway Cheddington to Aylesbury Line	Marston Gate
