= London Underground rolling stock =

Passenger trains that run on the London Underground

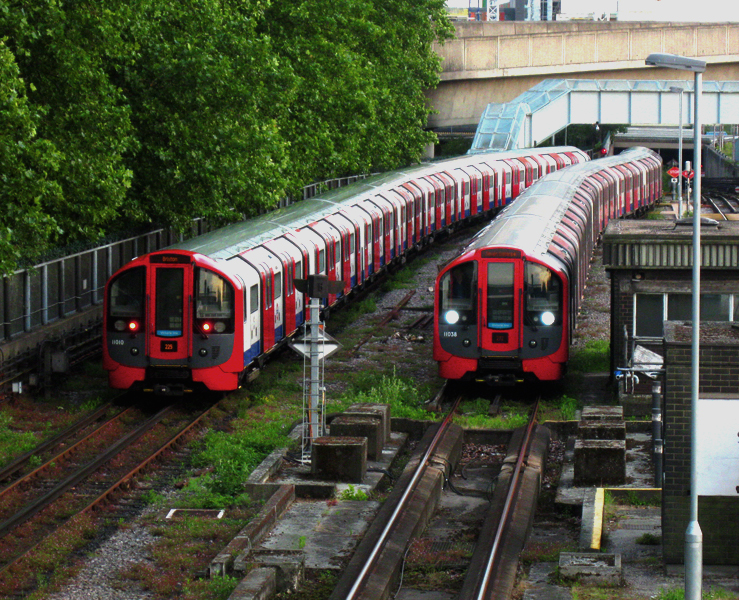
Two London Underground 2009 Stock trains at the Northumberland Park Depot.

The London Underground uses two types of rolling stock: smaller deep-level tube trains and larger sub-surface trains of a similar size to those on British main lines, both running on standard gauge tracks. New trains are designed for the maximum number of standing passengers and for speed of access to the cars.

The first underground passenger services started in 1863 when the Metropolitan Railway opened using steam locomotives hauling gas-lit wooden carriages, braked from a guards' compartment. In 1890, the City and South London Railway opened the world's first deep-level tube railway, using electric locomotives pulling carriages with small windows, nicknamed "padded cells". Other tube railways opened in the early 20th century using electric multiple units known as 'gate stock', as access to them was via lattice gates at each end of the car. The earlier railways had electrified the underground sections of their lines by 1907.

Pneumatic sliding doors were introduced on tube trains in 1919 and sub-surface trains in the late 1930s. Until the early 1960s an electric locomotive was exchanged for a steam locomotive on Metropolitan line services beyond Rickmansworth. The Victoria line opened in the late 1960s using automatic train operation (ATO), and the last trains ran with a guard in 2000. As of March 2013, the Central, Jubilee, and Northern lines also use forms of ATO, the latter two using a system called TBTC (transmission-based train control).

The older sub-surface trains were replaced between 2010 and 2017 by new air-conditioned S Stock, and the replacement of the 1972 Stock and the 1973 Stock on the Bakerloo and Piccadilly lines respectively is currently under consideration. They will be replaced by the New Tube for London.

== Current stock ==
London Underground trains come in two sizes, larger sub-surface trains and smaller deep-tube trains. Since the early 1960s all passenger trains have been electric multiple units (EMUs) with sliding doors. A train last ran with a guard in 2000. All lines use fixed-length trains with between six and eight cars, except for the Waterloo & City line, which uses four cars. New trains, which are designed for maximum number of standing passengers and for speed of access to the cars, have regenerative braking and public address systems.

Since 1999, all new stock has had to comply with accessibility regulations that require such things as access and room for wheelchairs, and the size and location of door controls. All underground trains are required to comply with The Rail Vehicle Accessibility (Non Interoperable Rail System) Regulations 2010 (RVAR 2010) by 2020.

Stock on sub-surface lines is identified by a letter (such as S Stock, used on all subsurface lines), while tube stock is identified by the year in which it was designed (such as 1996 Stock, used on the Jubilee line).

London Underground lines
| Line | Stock | Image | Introduced | Refurbishment | Driving | Number of cars | Car Length | Length | Seats | Capacity | Fleet size | Notes |
|---|---|---|---|---|---|---|---|---|---|---|---|---|
| Bakerloo | 1972 | | 1972–1974 | 1991–1995; 2016–2018; 2020–present | OPO | 7 | DM 16.091 m (52 ft 9.5 in) T/UNDM 15.977 m (52 ft 5.0 in) | 114 m (374 ft 1/4 in) | 268 | 851 | 36 | |
| Central | 1992 | | 1993–1995 | 2011–2012; 2020–present | ATO/ATP | 8 | 16.25 m (53 ft 4 in) | 133 m (436 ft 4 1/4 in) | 272 | 1047 | 85 | |
| Circle | S7 | | 2013–2014 | — | OPO; ATO/CBTC | 7 | 17.44 m (57 ft) (DM); 15.43 m (51 ft) (NDM) | 117.5 m (385 ft 6 in) | 256 | 1045 | 113 (shared between lines) | |
| District | S7 | | 2013–2017 (Note: The first S7 Stock train entered passenger service between Olympia and West Ham on the District line on 2 September 2013.) | — | OPO; ATO/CBTC | 7 | 17.44 m (57 ft) (DM); 15.43 m (51 ft) (NDM) | 117.5 m (385 ft 6 in) | 256 | 1045 | 113 (shared between lines) | |
| Hammersmith & City | S7 | | 2012–2014 | — | OPO; ATO/CBTC | 7 | 17.44 m (57 ft) (DM); 15.43 m (51 ft) (NDM) | 117.5 m (385 ft 6 in) | 256 | 1045 | 113 (shared between lines) | |
| Jubilee | 1996 | | 1997–1998; 2005–2006 | 2017–2019 | ATO/TBTC | 7 | 17.77 m (58 ft 4 in) | 126 m (413 ft 4 5/8 in) | 234 | 964 | 63 | |
| Metropolitan | S8 | | 2010–2012 | — | OPO; ATO/CBTC | 8 | 17.44 m (57 ft) (DM); 15.43 m (51 ft) (NDM) | 134 m (439 ft 7 5/8 in) | 306 | 1176 | 58 | |
| Northern | 1995 | | 1998–2000 | 2013–2015 | ATO/TBTC | 6 | 17.77 m (58 ft 3.6 in) | 108 m (354 ft 4 in) | 248 | 752 | 106 | |
| Piccadilly | 1973 | | 1975–1978 | 1996–2001 | OPO | 6 | DM 17.473 m (57 ft 3.9 in) UNDM/T 17.676 m (57 ft 11.9 in) | | 228 | 798 | 86.5 | |
| Victoria | 2009 | | 2009–2011 | — | ATO/DTG-R | 8 | 16.595 m (54 ft 5.3 in) (trailing cars) 16.345 m (53 ft 7.5 in) (all others) | 133 m (436 ft 4 1/4 in) | 288 | 986 | 47 | |
| Waterloo & City | 1992 | | 1993 | 2006 | OPO | 4 | 16.25 m (53 ft 4 in) | 66.5 m (218 ft 2 1/8 in) | 136 | 506 | 5 | |
OPO: One-person operation. No platform assistant when closing the doors.; ATO: Automatic train operation/ATP: Automatic train protection. Train is driven automatically.; CBTC: Communications-based train control/TBTC: Transmission-based train control.; DTG-R: Distance To Go - Radio, a radio based train protection system; DM/NDM: Driving Motor/Non Driving Motor. Refers to car with/without cab.; Capacity is based on Information Sheets, using Seating Capacity (full seats) + Max Observed Standing Capacity (5 people per sqm).

== Future development plans ==
=== 2024 Stock ===
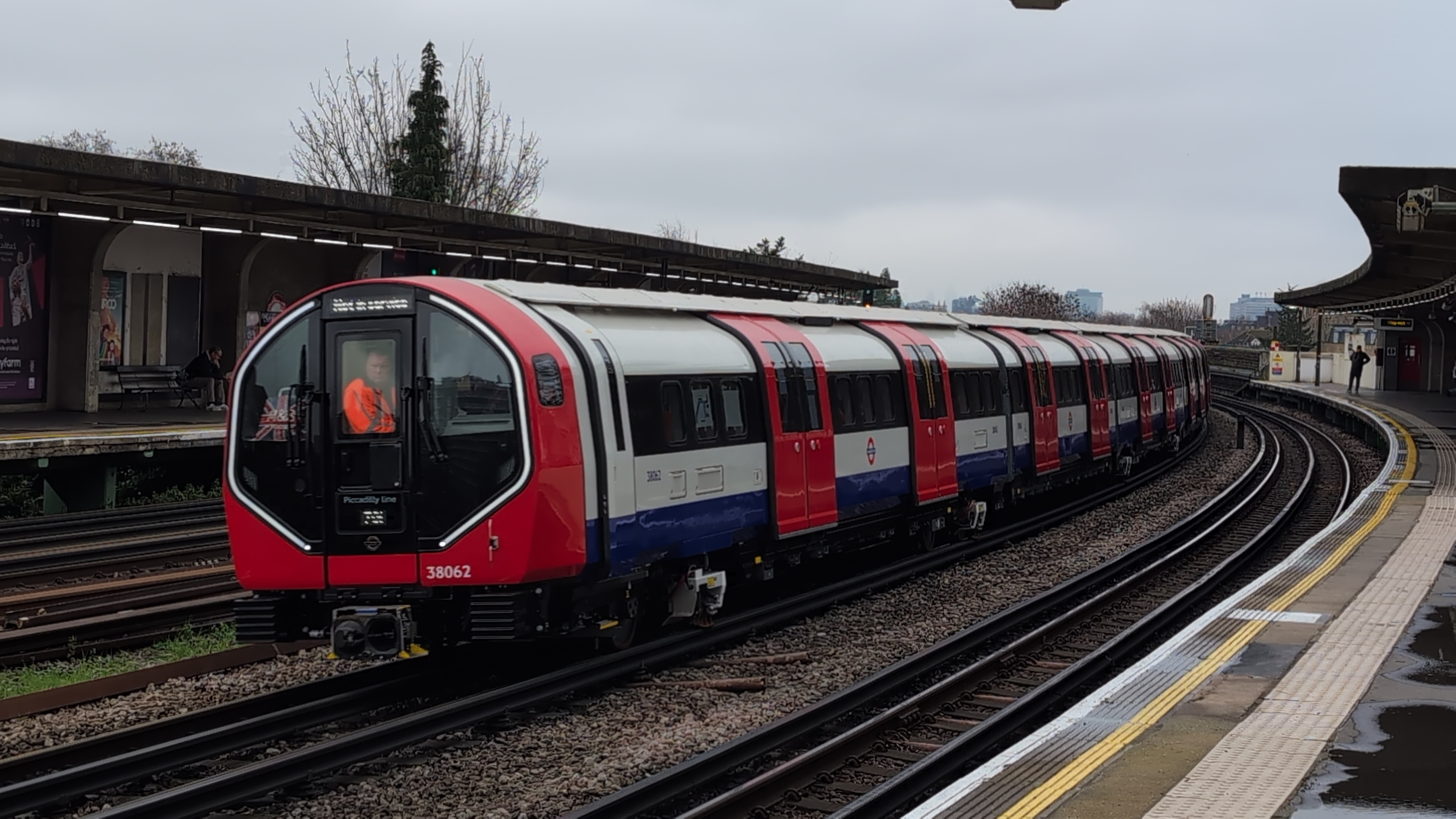
2024 Tube Stock passing Chiswick Park during a testing in March 2026

The Deep tube programme (DTP) originally covered the replacement of the trains and signalling on the Bakerloo and Piccadilly lines. It has been expanded to cover rolling stock requirements arising from the extension of the Northern line to Battersea, the eventual replacement of Central Line trains and proposed increased service frequency on the Northern and Jubilee lines. The EVO tube concept design, a lighter articulated train with walk through cars, was introduced early in 2011. In early 2014 the Bakerloo, Piccadilly, Central and Waterloo & City line rolling stock replacement project was renamed New Tube for London (NTfL) and moved from its feasibility stage to the design and specification stage. In late 2024 the first NTFL trains were delivered for storage and testing in London.

The proposal introduces fully automated trains and signalling to replace 1973 Stock which was due for replacement in 2014 but was deferred to 2024. It also plans to replace 1972 Stock due to the old age of the stock, which was actually due for replacement in 2020 but was delayed due to COVID-19 pandemic. It also plans to replace 1992 Stock but due to the young age it was being refurbished. The fully automated trains may not have drivers. The ASLEF and RMT trade unions that represent the drivers strongly oppose this, saying that it would be unsafe. Internal investigations from TfL revealed that the upgrades required to operate driverless trains were economically unviable.

== History ==
=== Steam locomotives ===
==== Metropolitan Railway ====
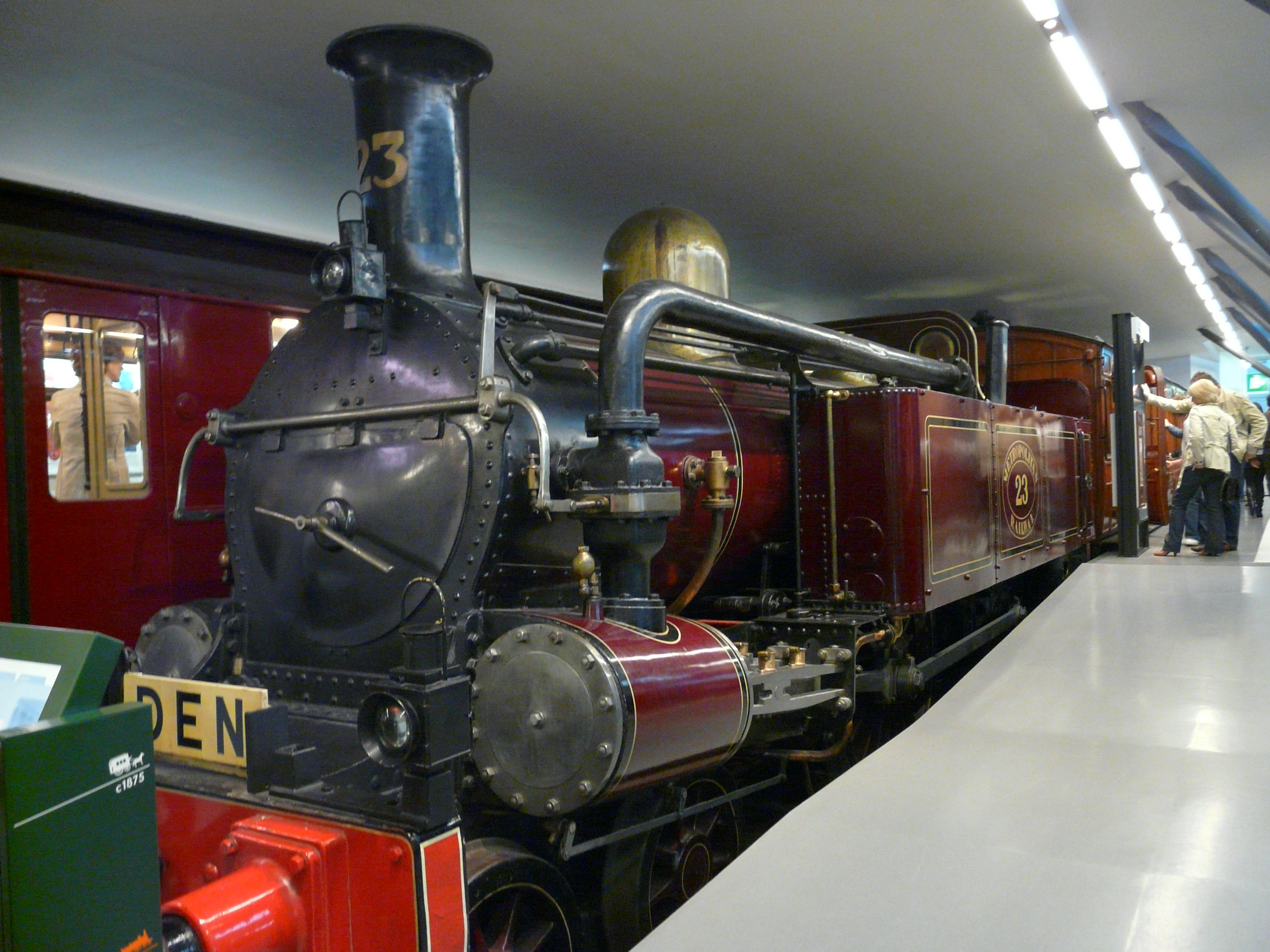
Metropolitan Railway steam locomotive number 23, one of only two surviving locomotives, is displayed at London Transport Museum.

Concern about smoke and steam in the tunnels led to trials before the line opened with an experimental "hot brick" locomotive nicknamed Fowler's Ghost. This was unsuccessful and the first public trains were hauled by broad gauge GWR Metropolitan Class condensing 2-4-0 tank engines designed by Daniel Gooch. These were followed by standard gauge Great Northern Railway locomotives and then by the Metropolitan Railway's own standard gauge locomotives. All tank engines, these locomotives were classified by letters of the alphabet. Initially eighteen A Class (4-4-0) were ordered in 1864. By 1870 a total of forty-four had been built. In 1885, an improved version was ordered and twenty-two B Class were built.

From 1891, more locomotives were needed for work on the line from Baker Street into the country. Four C Class (0-4-4) were received in 1891 and six D Class (2-4-0) in 1894. From 1896 to 1901 seven E Class (0-4-4) locomotives were built to replace the A class on this line. In 1901 the Met also received four F Class (0-6-2), a freight variant of the E Class. Not all these new locomotives were fitted with the condensing equipment needed to work south of Finchley Road.

The need for more powerful engines meant in 1915 four G Class (0-6-4) arrived, named after people or places associated with the Metropolitan Railway. Eight 75 mph (121 km/h) capable H Class (4-4-4) were built in 1920 for express passenger services, replacing the C and D class locomotives. In 1925, six freight K Class (2-6-4) locomotives arrived. These were out of gauge south of Finchley Road.

==== District Railway ====
The first services were run by the Metropolitan Railway. In 1871 the District Railway began running its own services with locomotives that were identical to the Metropolitan Railway A Class already in use. Twenty were supplied initially, and by 1905 the District had 54 locomotives. After the railway had been electrified by 1907 all but six of the steam locomotives had been sold. In 1925 two locomotives were retained for departmental use.

==== London Passenger Transport Board ====
In November 1937, the later Metropolitan Railway G, H and K Class steam locomotives were transferred to the London and North Eastern Railway (LNER), who took over all freight workings and became responsible for hauling passenger trains with steam locomotives north of Rickmansworth. From the early 1940s, these were replaced by ex Great Central Railway locomotives, now classified LNER Class A5. These were replaced in 1948 by LNER L1s. Former LMS locomotives replaced the L1s ten years later, when the joint line was transferred to British Railways' London Midland Region. Steam working ended on passenger trains in 1961, after electrification and the introduction of A Stock electric multiple units.

=== Electric locomotives ===
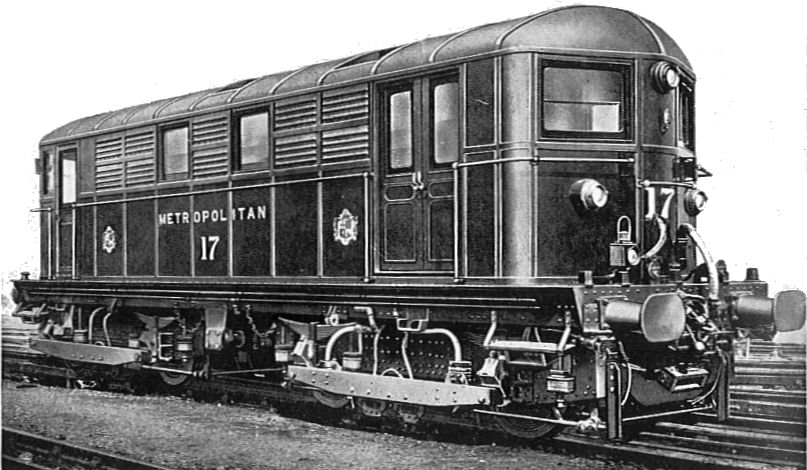
Metropolitan Railway electric locomotive No. 17

The City and South London Railway tube line opened in 1890 with electric locomotives hauling carriages. Initially the locomotive could haul three carriages at an average 13 1/2 miles per hour (21.7 km/h); the trains were air braked, their reservoirs topped up at Stockwell. Fourteen locomotives were initially built, soon supplemented by more. When the railway was extended in 1900 a further 30 locomotives to an improved design were built, and 10 of the first generation rebuilt. In 1923 the railway was closed for reconstruction and tunnel enlargement, and the line reopened using newly built Standard Stock electrical multiple units.

When the Central London Railway opened in 1900, carriages were hauled by electric locomotives. However, the 44-ton locomotives had a high unsprung weight of 34 tons, and these caused noise and vibrations that could be felt at ground level. In 1902–03 the carriages were reformed into multiple units using a control system developed by Frank Sprague in Chicago.

The District Railway used electric locomotives on electrified underground lines that were exchanged for steam locomotives to continue over unelectrified track. Ten were built in 1905, and these operated in pairs, initially used to haul London and North Western Railway passenger trains on their Outer Circle route between Earl's Court and Mansion House. From 1910 trains from the London, Tilbury and Southend Railway were extended over the District, the steam locomotives being exchanged for electric ones at Barking. These locomotives were scrapped after the service was withdrawn in 1939.

Similarly Metropolitan Railway electric locomotives were used with conventional carriage stock. On the outer suburban routes an electric locomotive was used at the Baker Street end that was exchanged for a steam locomotive en route. The first ten had a central cab and were known as camel-backs, and these entered service in 1906. A year later another ten units with a box design and a driving position at both ends arrived. These were replaced by more powerful units in the early 1920s. The locomotives were withdrawn from passenger service after electrification to Amersham was completed in 1961, although three were kept as shunters.

=== Carriages ===
The Metropolitan Railway opened in 1863 with gas-lit wooden carriages hauled by steam locomotives. Lighting was provided by gas — two jets in first class compartments and one in second and third class compartments. Initially the carriages were braked with wooden blocks operated from the guards' compartments at the front and back of the train, giving off a distinctive smell. The Metropolitan and District railways both used loco-hauled carriages exclusively until they electrified in the early 20th century. The District railway replaced all its carriages with electric multiple units. The Metropolitan still used loco-hauled carriages on the outer suburban routes, where an electric locomotive at the Baker Street end was exchanged for a steam locomotive en route. Carriages were introduced in the later years of the 19th century that gave a better ride quality, steam heating, automatic vacuum brakes, electric lighting and upholstered seating in all classes.

The City & South London Railway tube line opened in 1890, with electric locomotives which hauled three carriages. Originally only provided with small windows, these were soon nicknamed "padded cells". These were replaced with standard tube stock when the line was rebuilt in 1923. The Central London Railway briefly used carriages when it opened in 1900, but these were re-formed into multiple units in 1902–03. New carriages, nicknamed "Dreadnoughts", were introduced on the Metropolitan main line in 1910. Two rakes had a Pullman coach that provided a buffet service for a supplementary fare. They contained a toilet and were built with steam heating. Electric heating was fitted in 1925. All carriages on the London Underground were replaced by the A Stock multiple units in the early 1960s.

=== Sub-surface electric multiple units ===
Before 1933 the sub-surface lines were run by two companies, the District Railway and Metropolitan Railway. The Circle line was operated jointly, although the Metropolitan operated most of the services from 1926.

==== District Railway ====
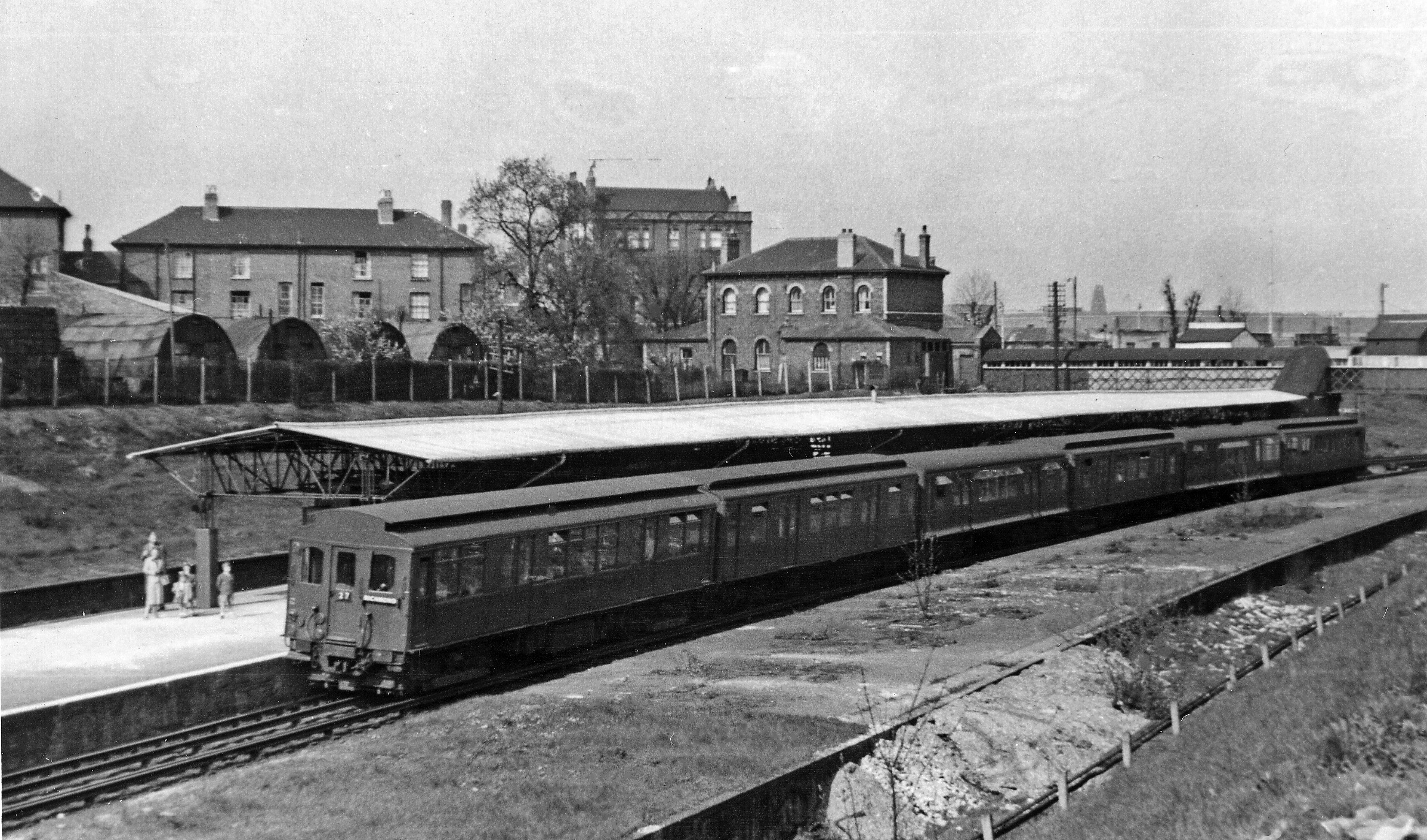
A District line train at Gunnersbury in 1955. The leading car, with a clerestory roof, is one of the District Railway cars built in 1923.

In 1903, the District tested two seven-car trains with different control and brake systems on its unopened line between Ealing and South Harrow. Access to the car was by platforms with lattice gates at their ends and hand-operated sliding doors on the car sides. Later some trailer cars were fitted with driving controls, and two- and three-car trains operated from Mill Hill Park (now Acton Town) to Hounslow Town and South Harrow and later Uxbridge, until they were withdrawn in 1925.

The District Railway ordered 60 × 7-car electric trains in 1903. A third of the vehicles were made in England, the rest in Belgium and France, and electrical equipment was installed on arrival at Ealing Common Works. Access was by sliding doors, double doors in the centre and single doors at either end. First- and third-class accommodation was provided in open saloons with electric lighting. The seats were covered with rattan in third class and plush in first. From 1906 the standard formation was six cars, with an equal number of motor and trailer cars running in either two- or four-car formations off-peak.

By 1910 the District required additional rolling stock and ordered cars largely constructed of steel. The first batch arrived in 1911, followed by more in 1912 from a different manufacturer but to a similar design. Further cars arrived in 1914 with an elliptical roof instead of the clerestory roof (Note: A clerestory roof has a raised centre section with small windows and/or ventilators.) on the earlier designs. In 1920 the District took delivery of new cars, incompatible with the existing fleet, with three hand-operated double sliding doors on each side.

In 1923, fifty motor cars were ordered to allow some of the original 1904–05 cars to be scrapped. In 1926, the District Railway classified its rolling stock using letters of the alphabet, the original prototype being A Stock, the production cars B Stock, and so on. In that year, two stock pools were created. Mainline trains were formed from 101 new motor cars supplemented by motor cars rebuilt from the steel-bodied cars originally constructed in 1910–14 and 1923, and trailers modified from the original wooden-bodied cars. A small pool of unmodified 'local stock' worked the shuttles from Acton Town to South Acton, South Harrow and Hounslow.

==== Metropolitan Railway ====
The first order for electric multiple units was placed with Metropolitan Amalgamated in 1902 for 50 trailers and 20 motor cars with Westinghouse equipment, which ran as 6-car trains. First- and third-class accommodation was provided in open saloons, second class being withdrawn from the Met. Access was at the ends via open lattice gates and the units were modified so that they could run off-peak as 3-car units. For the joint Hammersmith & City line service, the Met and the Great Western Railway purchased twenty 6-car trains with Thomson-Houston equipment.

In 1904, a further order was placed by the Met for 36 motor cars and 62 trailers with an option for another 20 motor cars and 40 trailers. Problems with the Westinghouse equipment led to Thomson-Houston equipment being specified when the option was taken up and more powerful motors being fitted. Before 1918, the motor cars with the more powerful engines were used on circle services with three trailers. The open lattice gates were seen as a problem when working above ground and all of the cars had been modified to replace the gates with vestibules by 1907. Having access only through the two end doors became a problem on busy circle services and centre sliding doors were fitted from 1911.

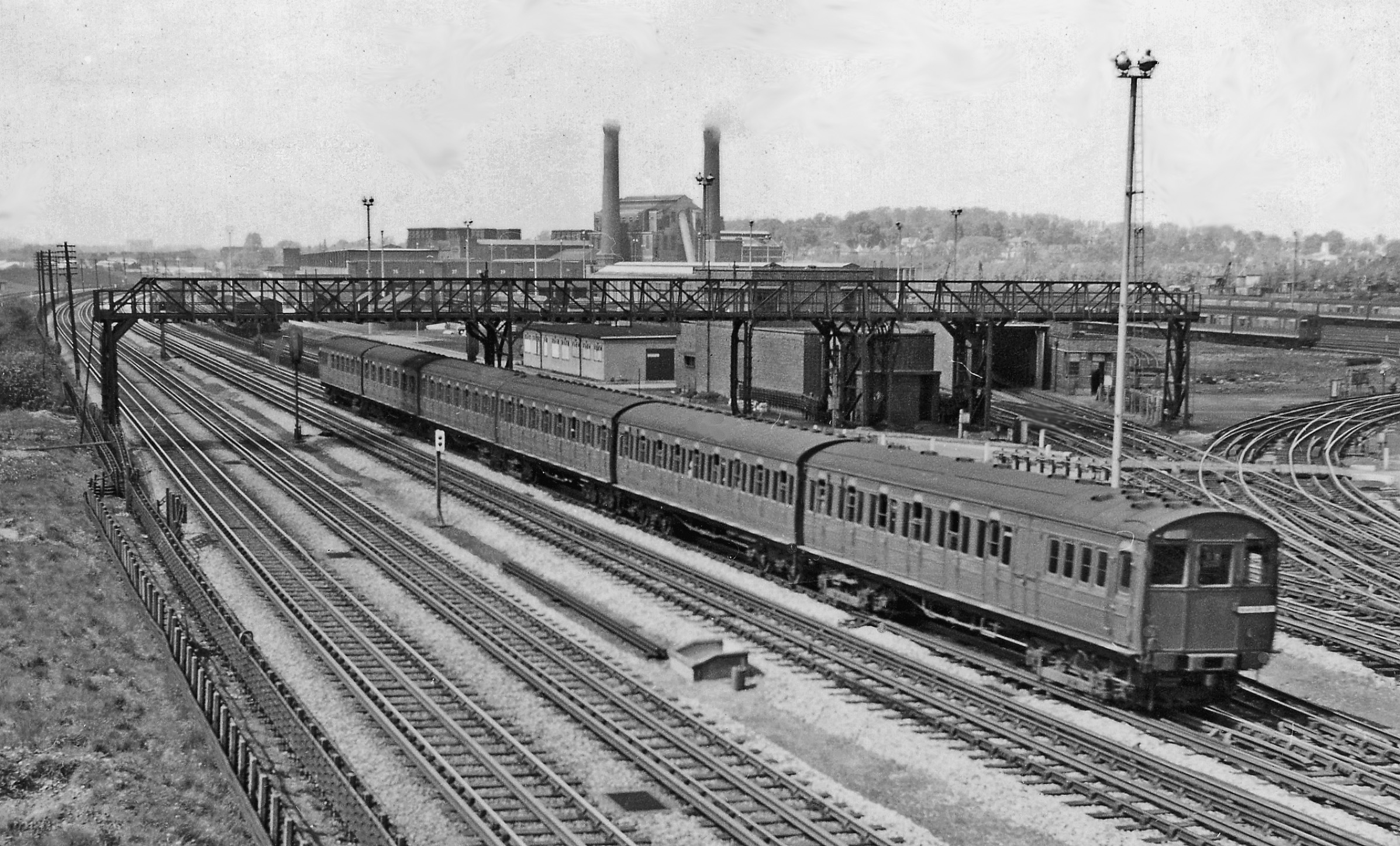
A T stock multiple unit at Neasden Depot, 1959

From 1906, some of the Ashbury bogie stock was converted into multiple units by fitting cabs, control equipment and motors. In 1910, two motor cars were modified with driving cabs at both ends. They started work on the Uxbridge-South Harrow shuttle service, before being transferred to the Addison Road shuttle in 1918. From 1925 to 1934 these vehicles were used between Watford and Rickmansworth.

In 1913, an order was placed for 23 motor cars and 20 trailers, saloon cars with sliding doors at the end and the middle. These started work on circle services, including the new electric service to New Cross via the East London line. In 1921, 20 motor cars, 33 trailers and 6 first-class driving trailers were received with three pairs of double sliding doors on each side. These were introduced on circle services.

Between 1927 and 1933 multiple unit compartment stock was built in batches by the Metropolitan Carriage & Wagon and Birmingham Railway Carriage & Wagon Company companies to be used on electric services from Baker Street and the City to Watford and Rickmansworth. The first order was only for motor cars; half had Westinghouse brakes, Metropolitan-Vickers control systems and four MV153 motors; they replaced the motor cars working with bogie stock trailers. The rest of the motor cars had the same motor equipment but used vacuum brakes, and worked with converted 1920/23 Dreadnought carriages to form 'MV' units.

In 1929, 'MW' stock was ordered, 30 motor coaches and 25 trailers similar to the 'MV' units, but with Westinghouse brakes. A further batch of 'MW' stock was ordered in 1931, this time from the Birmingham Railway Carriage & Wagon Co. This was to make seven 8-coach trains, and included additional trailers to increase the length of the previous 'MW' batch trains to 8 coaches. These had GEC WT545 motors, and although designed to work in multiple with the MV153, this did not work well in practice.

==== London Transport ====
In 1933, the Metropolitan and District railways were merged with the other underground railways, tramway companies and bus operators to form the London Passenger Transport Board (LTPB). In 1934, ninety former Metropolitan Railway cars were refurbished to form the Circle Stock. Although most of these cars were made in 1921, some were older. The motors were replaced and the cars were repainted a red and cream. Serving the Metropolitan main line there were three incompatible types of multiple unit compartment stock that had been built in 1927–33, and these were assembled into 9 × 8-car and 10 × 6-car trains after Westinghouse brakes were fitted and some cars regeared. The LPTB, continuing the District Railway multiple unt classification system labelled these T Stock.

In 1932 the District Railway to Upminster had been electrified and new vehicles bought. Similar cars were ordered to allow the Metropolitan line be extended to Barking and replace some of the rapidly deteriorating original wooden trailers. The 1935–40 New Works Programme fitted electro-pneumatic brakes and air-operated doors to most of the District line stock, these becoming Q Stock and allowing the remaining wooden cars to be scrapped. A number of motor cars not suitable for conversion retained their hand-worked doors, and known as H Stock these ran until 1957.

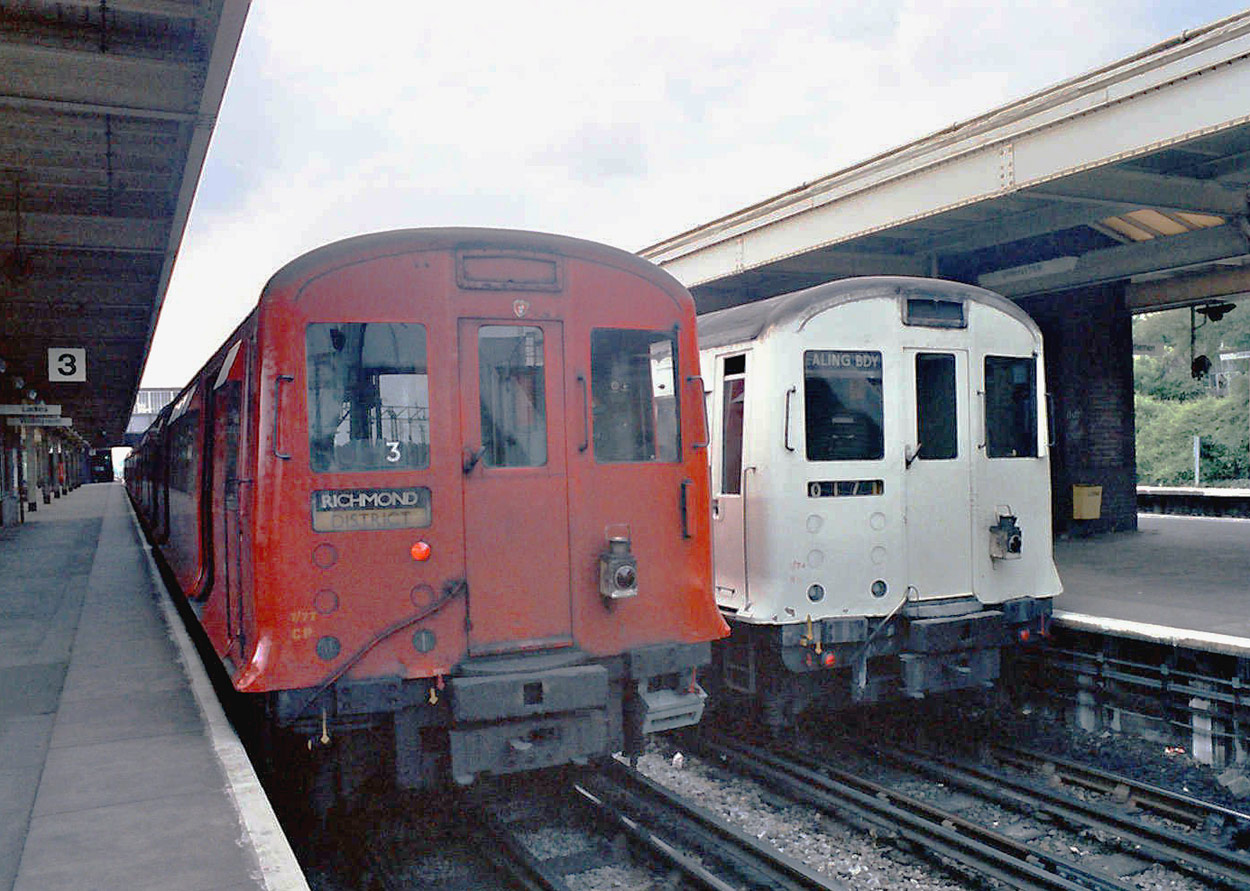
P stock in red with R Stock at Upminster

The joint Met and GWR stock on the Hammersmith & City line dating from 1905 was replaced by O stock that initially operated in 4 and 6-car formations, entering service from 1937. However, the train was entirely made of motor cars and this caused a problem with the electrical supply, so trailer cars were added from 1938. P Stock was ordered to replace all the remaining Metropolitan multiple units. A combination of 3-car units and 2-car units to run in six and eight car trains were delivered from July 1939. Two trailers were included in an eight car formation, but these were designed to allow conversion to motor cars at a later date after improvements to the power supply.

After World War II, R Stock, composed of new cars and the Q Stock trailers that had been built in 1938, replaced the trains with hand-operated sliding doors that remained on the District line. The new trains were built between 1949 and 1959, and after 1952 trains were constructed from aluminium, saving weight. One train was left unpainted as an experiment and considered a success, so between 1963–68 trains were left unpainted or painted white or grey to match. A number of former District Railway F Stock became available for use on the Metropolitan line. These mainly worked the semi-fast Harrow and Uxbridge services, although they also ran on the East London line as modified four-car sets. This transfer allowed the Circle Stock to be replaced by 5-car trains of O and P Stock. After 1955, the traction control equipment was replaced on these trains and the cars relabelled CO and CP stock as appropriate.

When the Amersham electrification project commenced in 1959, London Transport placed an order for 248 cars of A60 stock to replace the T stock and remaining locomotive hauled trains. A further twenty-seven trains of the A62 stock were built in 1962–63 to replace the F and P stock trains on the Uxbridge service. These were arranged as 4-car units which could operate as four or eight car trains. Four car units operated on the Chesham shuttle and, from 1977, on the East London line. The transfer of CO/CP Stock from the Metropolitan to the District line in the early 1960s allowed some of the Q stock to be scrapped.

In 1968, an order was placed for 35 six car trains to replace the CO/CP Stock on the Hammersmith & City and Circle lines. These were arranged as two units with a driving cab in the motor car at one end only and normally run as three pairs. These trains were designated C69 stock. The remaining CO/CP and R Stock on the District line were replaced in the late 1970s by new trains. A shorter train was needed on the Edgware Road branch due to the platform lengths so more of the C stock units. The rest of the District line could use longer trains and new D Stock trains were introduced between 1980 and 1983.

A new Fire Safety Code of Practice, drawn up following the King's Cross fire in November 1987, lead to internal refurbishment of trains that included replacing the interior panelling and fitting or improving the public address systems. At the same time the exterior of the trains were painted as it had proved difficult to remove graffiti from unpainted aluminium. The first refurbished trains were presented to the media in September 1989, and the project launched in July 1991.

In the early 2010s, A, C and D Stock trains used on the Metropolitan, District, Circle and Hammersmith & City lines were replaced by new air-conditioned, open-gangway S Stock trains. Also, the sub-surface track, electrical supply and signalling systems are being upgraded in a programme designed to increase peak-hour capacity by the end of 2018. A single control room for the sub-surface network is to be established in Hammersmith and an automatic train control (ATC) system will replace signalling equipment installed from the 1940s.

=== Tube electric multiple units ===
==== Early trains ====
The first tube railway, the City and South London Railway, opened in 1890 with electric locomotives hauling carriages. In 1898, the Waterloo and City Railway opened to the public using electric multiple units. Each four-car train had two trailers and two motor-cars with two 60 hp (45 kW) motors that could be directly controlled from either car. A four car train seated 204, and access was by sliding doors at the car ends leading to a platform protected by a gate.

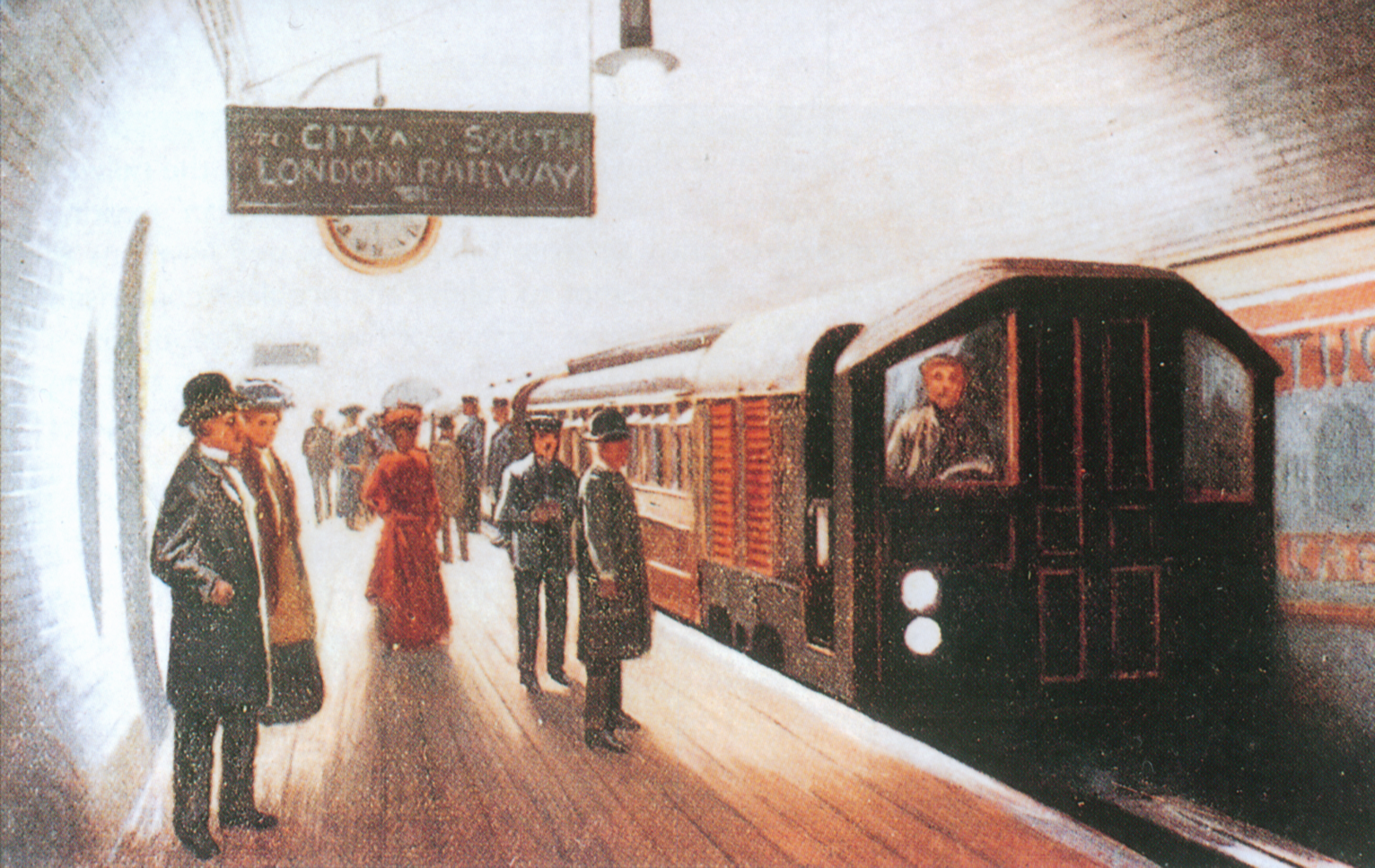
Central London Railway motor car in 1903

When the Central London Railway opened in 1900, carriages were hauled by heavy electric locomotives that caused vibrations that could be felt on the surface. In 1903, 64 motor-cars were delivered and the carriages were reformed into multiple units using a control system developed by Frank Sprague in Chicago. Initially there were 168 carriages, each 45 feet 6 inches (13.87 m) long, with access via sliding doors to a gated platform as on the Waterloo & City. Seating was mostly longitudinal for 48 passengers and straps were provided for those standing. The Great Northern and City Railway was a built to take main line trains from the Great Northern Railway (GNR) at Finsbury Park to the City at a terminus at Moorgate. However the GNR refused permission for trains to use its Finsbury Park station, so platforms were built beneath the station instead. Public service on the line began in 1904, using larger electric multiple units with control equipment supplied by British Thomson-Houston.

The Underground Electric Railways Company of London had been established in April 1902 by the American Charles Yerkes to build and run three cross-London tube lines: the Charing Cross, Euston and Hampstead Railway (now part of the Northern line), Baker Street and Waterloo Railway (Bakerloo line) and the Great Northern, Piccadilly and Brompton Railway (Piccadilly line). A power station capable of providing power for these tube lines was built at Lots Road, by Chelsea Creek.

Similar electric multiple units were purchased for the three lines, controversially from America, France and Hungary, and known as "Gate Stock", as access to the cars was via lattice gates at each end. Motor cars, trailers and control trailers were coupled to make a train of two to six cars, with the motor cars positioned at the outer ends. These had full width control compartments behind the driver and seated about 40, whereas the trailers seated about 50. A gateman operated the lattice gates using a crank handle and announced each station as the train approached. A bell rung by the rear guard when all gates were closed was echoed down the train by each gateman until the front guard signalled the driver to proceed.

More trains were bought in 1914 for the Bakerloo line extension to Paddington. To speed up boarding these cars had inward swinging centre doors that were under the control of the gatemen. From 1915 the Bakerloo was extended to a junction with the London & North Western Railway (LNWR) at Queen's Park and because of the difficulties of World War I, cars were transferred from the Piccadilly line. From 1917 tube trains ran through to Watford Junction using Central London Railway motor cars that had been built for an uncompleted extension to Ealing.

These returned in 1920 when the extension opened and the Watford Joint Stock, two thirds owned by the LNWR, arrived. Four and six car trains were formed, a motor car permitted in the middle of a tube train as there was an emergency passage through the control compartment. Access was by three single inwardly swinging doors on either side of the cars. Cars with sliding pneumatic doors were ordered in 1919 for the Piccadilly line. No gatesmen were needed and these trains were staffed by a driver and two guards. An open door was first indicated by a semaphore arm, but these were easily damaged, and by 1923 interlock switches proving the doors were closed were introduced.

==== Standard Stock ====
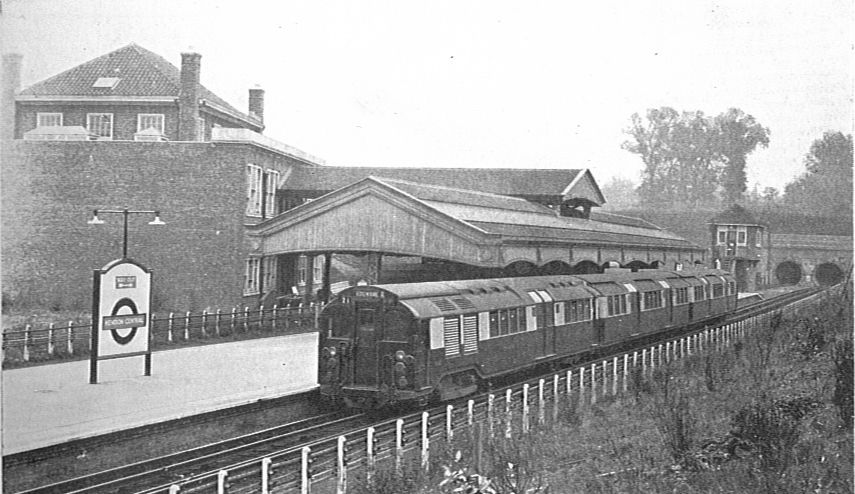
Three car Standard Stock train at Hendon Central on today's Northern line

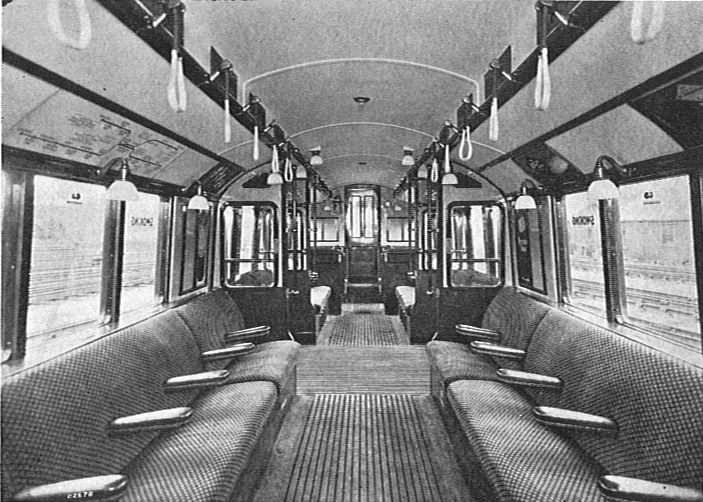
Longitudinal seating inside the motor car

There were major extensions of the City & South London and the Hampstead lines in the 1920s. The tunnels of the City & South London Railway were rebuilt to have the same diameter of the other tubes, and extended north to a junction with the Hampstead line at Camden Town, and south to Morden. The Hampstead line was extended to Edgware and south to another junction with the City & South London at Kennington, this opening in 1926. New stock was required to run on the rebuilt City & South London and extensions so in 1922 six prototype cars were ordered from five manufacturers. With attention given to noise reduction, there were two 4-foot-6-inch (1.37 m) pneumatic doors on each side of the trailers.

From this development work a total of 1,460 cars of Standard Stock were built by six manufacturers in 18 batches between 1923 and 1934. Production cars were first ordered in 1923. The Hampstead line received the first of these later in 1923. Motor cars had a control compartment with a central gangway over the motored bogie and seated 30. The trailers seated 48 and the control trailers 44, with transverse and longitudinal seating. Initially trains had a crew of three, a driver and two guards. In 1928, once the use of air-operated doors had proved to be successful, modifications were made to enable a train to be operated by a crew of two.

Between 1926 and 1928, the Central London cars were converted to air-door operation and it had been planned to convert the Gate Stock on the Piccadilly and Bakerloo lines. The cost of building a new car was only slightly more than the cost of converting an old one, and an order for new cars was placed. Delivered in 1929 and 1930, these vehicles enabled Gate Stock to be withdrawn from the Piccadilly line in June 1929. The last gate stock train ran on 1 January 1930. After 1929 the design was slightly altered with longer cars with wider doors and additional single-leaf doors on the trailers and electro-pneumatic brakes. Trains of this design were bought in 1931 and 1934 for the extensions of the Piccadilly line to South Harrow and Uxbridge, Hounslow and Cockfosters.

==== London Passenger Transport Board ====
The merger of London's underground railways, tramway companies and bus operators to form the London Passenger Transport Board (LTPB) was followed by the 1935–40 New Works Programme that included extension of the Bakerloo, Central and Northern lines. New trains were needed and four prototype six-car trains were built, three with streamlined cabs. Modern electrical equipment was fitted under the floor, removing the need for a control compartment on the motor cars, increasing the number of seats to 40. 1938 Stock, without the streamlining, entered service on the Northern line in June 1938. A seven-car train was formed from two trailer cars and five motor cars, one of which had no cab, the increased power giving greater acceleration.

A total of 1,121 cars were built. By 1938 the Central line had been converted from the original 3-rail to the 4-rail system, the tunnels enlarged and platforms lengthened to take 8-car trains of the displaced Standard Stock, the last Central London Railway train running in 1939. In the same year Standard Stock replaced the 1904 Gate Stock on the isolated Northern City Line. The Bakerloo line received some 1938 Stock, these running with some converted trailers of Standard Stock. The Central line extensions were suspended during World War II and many Standard Stock cars were placed in store. These cars were in a poor state after the war and extensive refurbishment was needed when the extensions had been completed. After the war more trains were needed. With limited resources, 89 cars to the same design as the 1938 Stock (1949 Stock) were ordered and the pre-war streamlined prototypes were rebuilt. These were introduced on the Piccadilly line, releasing some Standard Stock to augment the trains on the Central line.

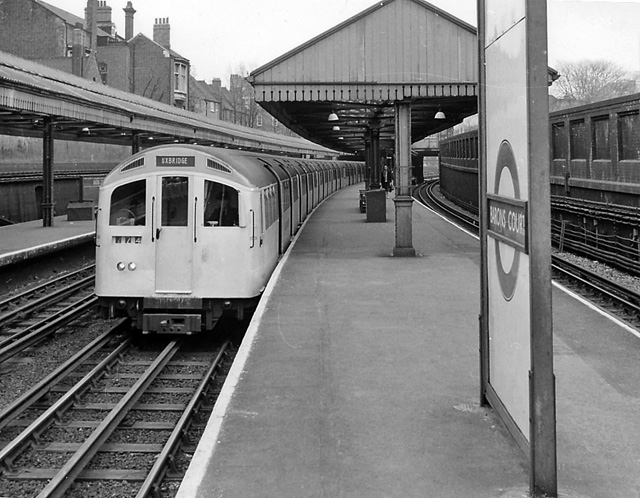
An unpainted aluminium 1959 Stock train on the Piccadilly line at Barons Court, 1962

Three prototype aluminium-bodied seven-car trains were ordered in 1956, to be followed by 76 × 7-car trains of 1959 Stock. It was planned that these would be introduced on the Piccadilly line, allowing the later Standard Stock cars to be transferred to the Central line. However the Central line's Standard Stock was proving troublesome and the trains were diverted to replace these trains, augmented with an extra car. A follow on order of 1962 Stock, as it became known, entered service on the Central line, releasing the 1959 Stock for the Piccadilly line. Standard Stock was withdrawn from the Central line in 1963 and Piccadilly line in 1964.

Building the Victoria line had been recommended in a 1949 report, as it would reduce congestion on other lines. New trains were needed for the new line, and eight-car trains made up from two four-car units with two driving motors and two trailers were ordered in 1964. Trials of automatic train operation (ATO) were carried out on the District line in 1962–63, followed by longer term operation on the Central line on a shuttle service between Woodford and Hainault. Successful, the Victoria line was equipped with its 1967 Stock, and as the new trains arrived they spent three weeks working between Woodford and Hainault. The line opened to Victoria in stages in 1968–69 and extended to Brixton in 1971.

In the 1970s, the Piccadilly line was extended to Heathrow Airport. The Jubilee line was built under central London, taking over the Bakerloo line's Stanmore branch at Baker Street. The isolated Northern City line was connected with the suburban railway at Finsbury Park. The Standard Stock trains had been replaced by 1938 Stock in 1966, and they last ran in the tunnels in 1975. A through main line service started in 1976 and the line transferred to British Rail.

A new fleet of trains was to be built for the Piccadilly line, and its 1956–59 Stock was to replace the 1938 Stock trains elsewhere on the system. However, in 1970 the service on the Northern line was poor, with up to 40 services a day being cancelled due to its aging 1938 Stock and poor industrial relations at that time at Acton Works. The Northern line urgently needed newer trains and 30 more than would be available from the Piccadilly line. The first batch of 1972 Stock, known afterwards as Mk I stock, was ordered to fill this shortfall. Rapidly designed, this was the 1967 stock design adapted for operation with a driver and guard, entering service on the Northern line between 1972 and 1973.

The Jubilee line needed 33 trains and a second order of 1972 Stock, known as Mk II, was ordered. Entering service on the Northern line between 1973 and 1974, these differed from the Mk Is as it was planned to convert the line to ATO. These were transferred to the Bakerloo line in 1977. When the Jubilee line opened in 1979 it used the 1972 Mk II stock while the Bakerloo line had 36 trains of refurbished 1938 stock. The 1973 Stock ordered for the Piccadilly line was a new design. Instead of seven cars, the trains were composed of six cars, each about 6 feet (1.8 m) longer than the 1959 Stock cars. This allowed a symmetrical train with fewer cars and bogies. Space for luggage for passengers connecting with flights at Heathrow was left beside the doors, leaving 44 seats in each car.

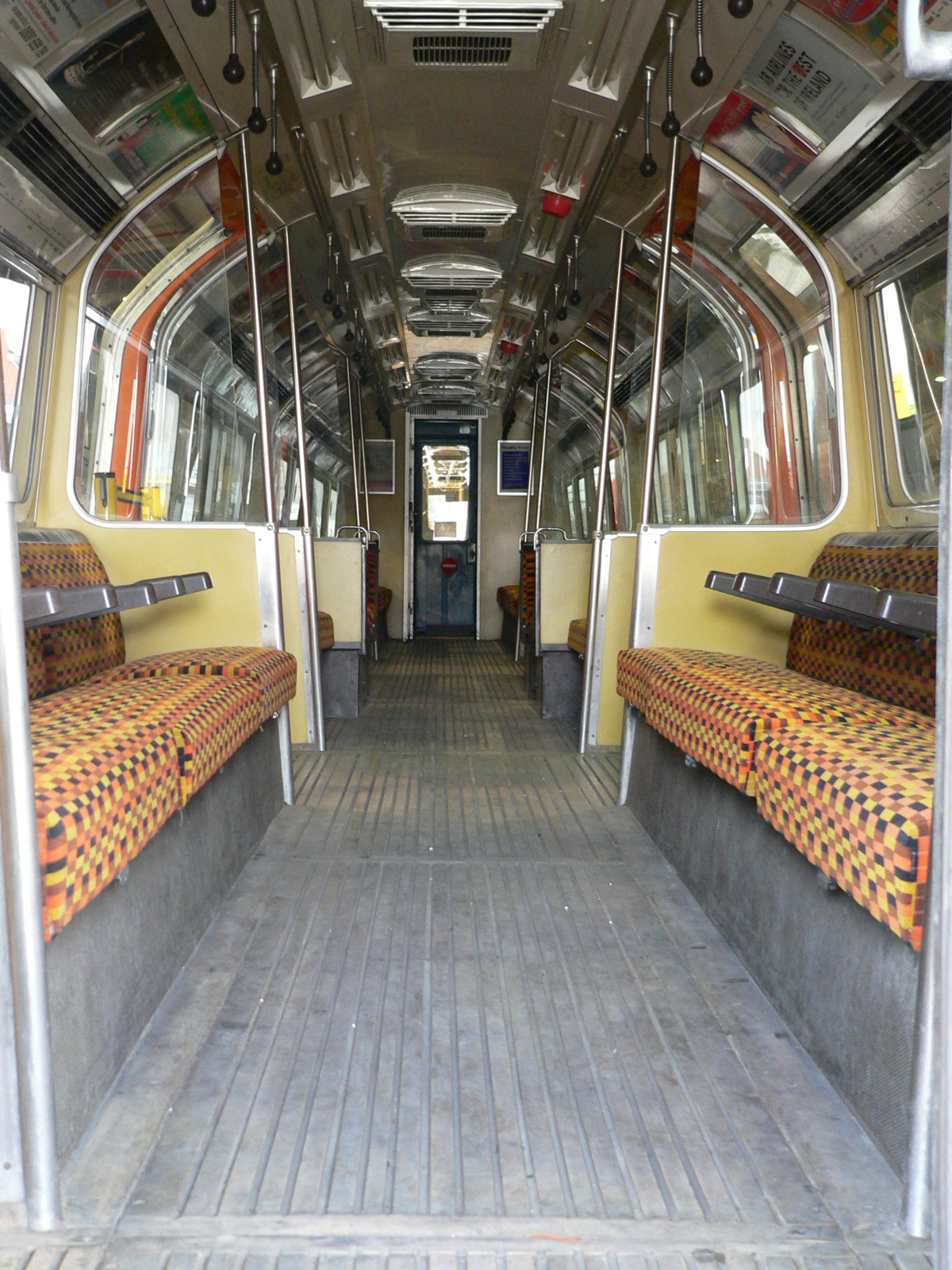
Inside 1983 Stock as used on the Jubilee line

Estimating that the remaining 1938 Stock needed replacement by 1984, in 1979 London Transport proposed building 33 trains for the Jubilee line, releasing its trains for use elsewhere on the system. After some negotiation 15 trains were ordered with an option for a further 13. The resulting 1983 Stock was a development of the 1973 Stock, with six of the longer 58 feet (18 m) cars, but with single leaf doors, similar to the D Stock that had been introduced on the District line. Trains entered service between 1984 and 1985, with each new delivery triggering a cascade with a 1972 Mk II moving to the Northern line, replacing a 1959 Stock that moved to the Bakerloo line, allowing a 1938 Stock train to be scrapped. In 1986 passenger numbers were increasing and a further 16 1/2 trains of 1983 Stock were ordered. These entered service in 1987–88.

After agreement about One Person Operation (OPO) was reached with the trade unions in 1983, work began converting trains and lines. The 1972 Mk II, 1973 and 1983 Stocks were able to be converted and guards were removed from trains on the Piccadilly line in 1987, the Jubilee line in 1988 and the Bakerloo line in 1989. The second order of 1983 stock and completion of the OPO stock conversions allowed the Jubilee line fleet to be made up of 1983 Stock and the Bakerloo line with 1972 Mk II Stock. Some 1972 Mk I stock cars were released to be converted to augment the Victoria line fleet, running in the middle of eight-car trains.

The signalling on the Central line needed replacement by the late 1980s. It was decided to bring forward the replacement of the 1962 Stock, due at about the same time as the 1959 Stock running on the Northern line. The signalling was to be replaced with an updated version of the ATO system then in used on the Victoria line, the line traction supply boosted and new trains built. Prototype trains were built with two double and two single doors hung on the outside of the train and electronic traction equipment that gave regenerative and rheostatic braking. The first 8 16.2 metres (53 ft 1 3/4 in) long car trains of 1992 Stock entered service in 1993. While the necessary signalling works for ATO were in progress, OPO was phased in from 1993–95.

ATP was commissioned from 1995–97 and ATO from 1999–2001, with a centralised control centre in West London. A train refurbishment project was launched in July 1991, triggered by a new Fire Safety Code of Practice after the King's Cross fire and to combat graffiti. The short Waterloo & City line had been operated by the main line railways, and the original stock replaced in 1940. This stock was increasingly unreliable, with the line closing for two weeks in March 1989 and again in May 1991. Five 4-car trains of 1992 Stock were ordered by British Rail and these entered service in 1993. London Underground took over the line in 1994.

To allow the Jubilee line to be extended to Stratford, a new fleet of trains was ordered in 1992 to replace the 1983 Stock running on the line, as the cost of a new fleet was calculated to be the same as refurbishing the older trains to run with the newer trains. The result was the 1996 Stock, with the first train being delivered in 1996. On the Jubilee line a seventh car was added to trains at the end of 2005.

The Northern line stock needed replacement and the 1995 Stock replaced the mixture of 1959, 1962 and 1972 Mk I Stock trains that were used on the line, the first trains arriving in 1998. These trains are similar, composed of 17.7 metres (58 ft 7/8 in) long cars with externally hung doors, but with differing traction equipment. OPO operation was introduced on the Northern line with the new trains. The last service with a guard operated on the London Underground in January 2000. A new signalling system allowing automatic operation was commissioned in 2011.

On the Victoria line, new 2009 Stock trains were introduced between July 2009 and June 2011. A new signalling system and improvements to track work allowed for an increase to frequency of service to up to 36 trains per hour, the most frequent in the UK and one of the most frequent in Europe.

==== Isle of Wight ====
Although the Isle of Wight is approximately 80 miles (130 km) south of London, its railway has used tube trains since 1967. In the early 1960s it was proposed to close the island's whole railway network, but the route from Ryde Pier Head to Shanklin was kept as buses could not cope with the summer holiday traffic. Updating the system was necessary, but tunnels on the island required rolling stock 10 inches (250 mm) lower than the standard main line stock. The line was electrified and forty-three cars of Standard Stock were purchased by British Rail, delivered in the spring of 1967 and ready for that summer season.

These trains were replaced in 1989 by 1938 Stock, refurbished and formed into two-car Class 483 units. In January 2021 the 1938 Stock was withdrawn from service. The line underwent engineering works (including platform height raising, and the restoration of a previously removed passing loop) to allow more recent London Underground D78 Stock to operate. These heavily refurbished train sets are classified as the Class 484 and (after some delays caused by software issues) entered service in November 2021. Five units are in service on the island, each formed of two cars.

==== Alderney ====
Alderney Railway in the Channel Islands previously used two London Underground 1938 Stock cars from the Bakerloo and Northern lines, returning them badly rusted to the UK in 2000 for spares, and replacing them with former London Underground 1959 Stock cars nos. 1044 and 1045.

=== Inter-car barriers ===
All London Underground rolling stock are fitted with safety barriers between the cars to prevent passengers from boarding trains from in between the cars and to prevent drunk people from falling between cars and being seriously injured. These were first fitted to the D78 Stock and 1973 Stock in late 1997, and were fitted to the rest of the rolling stock in 2000. Unfortunately, this meant the mounting of blisters on the front ends of the C Stock as well as the double ended A Stock, D Stock, 1967 Stock and 1973 Stock in the case the cabs were coupled in the middle of a train. They also became a maintenance problem and an operational inconvenience when coupling and uncoupling cars.

=== Fire extinguishers ===
All tube carriages originally had fire extinguishers located at the ends of the carriages. Between 1999 and 2001, all tube carriages had their fire extinguishers removed due to excessive violence and vandalism. Fire extinguishers were often used as weapons for attacks on passengers and staff which caused services to be disrupted and too much money had to be spent on replacing fire extinguishers. Their removal was criticised following the 1987 King's Cross fire. Because of fires in tube carriages becoming very hard to start, following the train refurbishment program in the 1990s, it was decided that it was no longer cost-effective to replace stolen or damaged fire extinguishers. Their removal began on the Central line in 1999 and was completed by 2001. Fire extinguishers were instead installed in the driver's cabs and on station platforms and were removed from tube carriages.

== Heritage vehicles ==
Two steam locomotives survive, one A Class No. 23 (LT L45) at the London Transport Museum, and E Class No. 1 (LT L44) is preserved at the Buckinghamshire Railway Centre. The Bluebell Railway has four 1898–1900 bogie carriages in running condition and a fifth is a static exhibit at the London Transport Museum. Also at the London Transport Museum is Metropolitan electric locomotive No. 5 "John Hampden", City and South London electric locomotive and "padded cell" carriage, District Railway E/Q23 multiple unit car, and a 1938-tube stock car.

A preserved carriage at the Kent and East Sussex Railway was thought to be a District Railway first class, but now thought likely to be a cutdown Metropolitan Railway eight wheeler. The Vintage Carriages Trust has three preserved Dreadnought carriages. The Spa Valley Railway is home to two cars of T-Stock.

To celebrate the 150th anniversary of the opening of the Metropolitan Railway special services ran in January 2013 using a restored 1892 "Jubilee" carriage, 1898–1900 bogie carriages, steam locomotive No. 1 and electric locomotive "Sarah Siddons". Further events are planned in 2013 for Locomotive No. 1, "Sarah Siddons" and the Jubilee carriage, including a Steam back on the Met scheduled for May.

To celebrate the 150th anniversary of the District Railway the London Transport Museum are restoring a three-car Q Stock train to run on the District Line as special services during 2018.

== Engineering trains ==
=== Locomotives ===
==== Steam locomotives ====
After the District Railway had electrified in 1907, it sold most of its locomotives. In 1925 two locomotives (No. 33 and No 34) remained for departmental use. In 1926 No. 33 was scrapped and replaced by Metropolitan Railway A Class No. 22, which became District No. 35. These were replaced in 1931 by two 0-6-0T goods locomotives bought from the Hunslet Engine Company. When they passed to London Transport in 1933, they were numbered L.30 and L.31. They were withdrawn in 1963.

In 1933 the Metropolitan Railway was still using steam locomotives on passenger trains. The LNER took over responsibility for steam working in 1937 and LT kept eleven locomotives for departmental work. From 1956 these were replaced by ex-GWR 0-6-0PT pannier tanks, to be replaced by diesel-hydraulic locomotives in 1971.

In 1899 the Central London Railway had two tube-gauge steam locomotives that were oil fired underground and could run on coal above ground. They were sold by 1921.

==== Battery-electric locomotives ====
A fleet of 37 battery-electric locomotives are in service, able to take power from the electrified rails or from an on-board battery.

==== Diesel locomotives ====
A fleet of 4 diesel locomotives are currently used as shunting locomotives in Ruislip Depot due to growing restrictions on where they can operate on the network.

== See also ==
- Automation of the London Underground
- London Underground rolling stock numbering and classification
