= Metropolitan Railway steam locomotives =

1864 steam locomotives

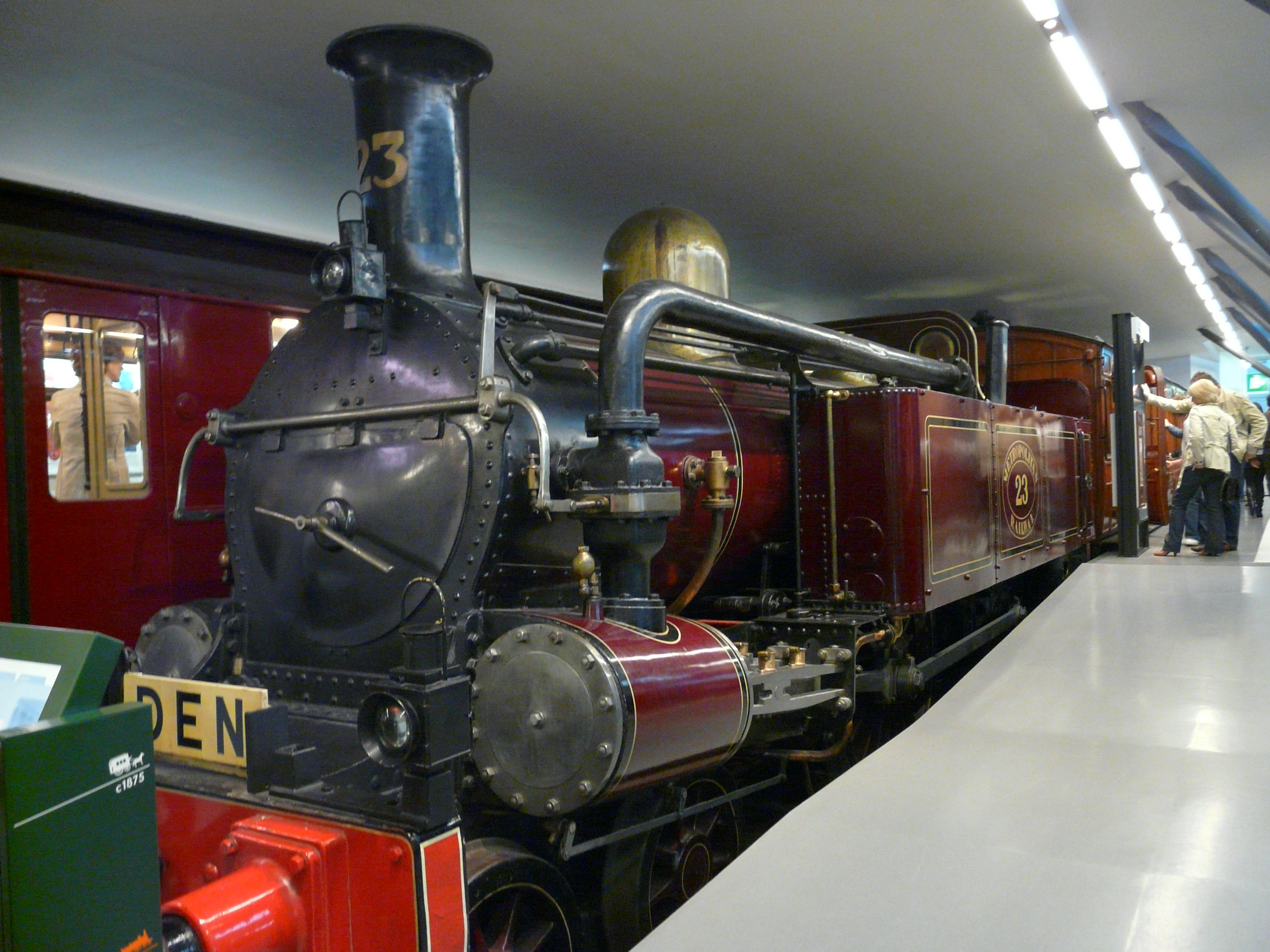
Metropolitan Railway steam locomotive number 23, one of only two surviving locomotives, is displayed at London Transport Museum.

The first Metropolitan Railway steam locomotives were ordered in 1864 for the Metropolitan Railway, to replace the Great Western Railway locomotive that had opened their first line the previous year. A total of 116 locomotives were built, of which two survive in preservation.

== History ==
Concern about smoke and steam in the tunnels led to new designs of steam locomotive. Before the line opened in 1861 trials were made with the experimental "hot brick" locomotive nicknamed Fowler's Ghost. This was unsuccessful and the first public trains were hauled by broad gauge GWR Metropolitan Class condensing 2-4-0 tank locomotives designed by Daniel Gooch. They were followed by standard gauge GNR locomotives until the Met received its own 4-4-0 tank locomotives. The locomotives were built by Beyer Peacock of Manchester. Their design is frequently attributed to the Met's Engineer John Fowler, but the locomotive was a development of one Beyers had built for the Spanish Tudela to Bilbao Railway, Fowler only specifying the driving wheel diameter, axle weight and the ability to navigate sharp curves. Eighteen were ordered in 1864, initially carrying names, and by 1870 a total of forty had been built. To reduce smoke underground, at first coke was burnt, changed in 1869 to smokeless Welsh coal.

From 1879, more locomotives were needed, and the design was updated and a total of twenty-four of these later locomotives were delivered between 1879 and 1885. Originally the locomotives were painted bright olive green lined in black and yellow, chimneys were copper capped with the locomotive number in brass figures at the front and domes were polished brass. In 1885, the colour changed to a dark red known as Midcared, and this was to remain the standard colour and taken up as the colour for the Metropolitan line by London Transport in 1933. When in 1925 the Met classified its locomotives by letters of the alphabet, these were assigned A Class and B Class. When the M&SJWR was being built, it was considered that the Class A and B tanks would struggle on the gradients and five Worcester Engine 0-6-0 tank locomotives were delivered in 1868. However, it was soon found that the Class A and B locomotives could manage trains without difficulty and the 0-6-0Ts were sold to the Taff Vale Railway in 1873 and 1875.

From 1891, more locomotives were needed for work on the extension line from Baker Street into the country. Four C Class (0-4-4) locomotives, a development of South Eastern Railway's 'Q' Class, were received in 1891. In 1894, two D Class locomotives were bought to run between Aylesbury and Verney Junction. These were not fitted with the condensing equipment needed to work south of Finchley Road. Four more were delivered in 1895 with condensing equipment, although these were prohibited working south of Finchley Road. In 1896, two E Class (0-4-4) locomotives were built by the Met at Neasden works, followed by one in 1898 to replace the original Class A No. 1, damaged in an accident. Four more were built by Hawthorn Leslie & Co in 1900 and 1901. To cope with the growing freight traffic on the extension line, the Met received four F Class (0-6-2) locomotives in 1901, similar to the E Class except for the wheel formula and without steam heat. In 1897 and 1899, the Met received two 0-6-0 saddle tank locomotives to a standard Peckett design. Unclassified by the Met, these were generally used for shunting at Neasden and Harrow.

Many locomotives were made redundant by the electrification of the inner London lines in 1905–06. By 1907, forty of the older class A and B had been sold or scrapped and by 1914 only thirteen locomotives of these classes had been retained for shunting, departmental work and working trains over the Brill Tramway. The need for more powerful locomotives for both passenger and freight services meant that, in 1915, four G Class (0-6-4) locomotives arrived from Yorkshire Engine Co. Eight 75 mph (121 km/h) capable H Class (4-4-4) locomotives were built in 1920 and 1921 and used mainly on express passenger services. To run longer, faster and less frequent freight services in 1925 six freight K Class (2-6-4) locomotives arrived, rebuilt from 2-6-0 locomotives manufactured at Woolwich Arsenal after World War I. These were not permitted south of Finchley Road.

In 1933 the Metropolitan Railway was absorbed into the newly created London Passenger Transport Board and on 1 November 1937 the later G, H and K Class steam locomotives were transferred to the London and North Eastern Railway (LNER) who took over all freight workings and became responsible for hauling passenger trains with steam locomotives north of Rickmansworth. From the early 1940s these were replaced by ex Great Central Railway locomotives, now classified LNER Class A5. These were replaced by LNER L1s after 1948 and ten years later in 1958 when the joint line was transferred to British Railway's London Midland Region former LMS locomotives replaced the L1s. Steam working ended on passenger trains after the introduction of the A Stock in 1961.

LT kept nine ex-Metropolitan steam locomotives for use on departmental work - one of the A Class, four of the E Class, and four of the F Class. From 1956 these were replaced by ex-GWR 5700 Class pannier tanks, which in turn were replaced by Sentinel diesel-hydraulic shunters in 1971.

== Preserved units ==
Two locomotives survive, one A Class No. 23 (LT L45) at the London Transport Museum, and E Class No. 1 (LT L44) is preserved at the Buckinghamshire Railway Centre.

== List ==
Numbers	Built	Builder	Type	Works Nos.	Class	Notes
1–9	1864	BP&C	4-4-0T	412–419	A	all services
10–18	1864	BP&C	4-4-0T	421–429	A	all services
19–23	1866	BP&C	4-4-0T	706–710	A	all services; 23 to LT L45
24–28	1868	BP&C	4-4-0T	770–774	A	all services
29–33	1869	BP&C	4-4-0T	853–857	A	all services; possibly works numbers 775-779
34–38	1868	WEC	0-6-0T	34-38	–	St. John’s Wood Extension line
34–38	1879	BP&C	4-4-0T	1878–1882	B	all services
39–44	1869	BP&C	4-4-0T	863–868	A	all services
45–49	1870	BP&C	4-4-0T	893–897	A	all services
50–53	1880	BP&C	4-4-0T	1937–1940	B	all services
54–56	1880	BP&C	4-4-0T	1944–1946	B	all services
57–59	1880	BP&C	4-4-0T	1941–1943	B	all services
60–64	1884	BP&C	4-4-0T	2579–2583	B	all services
65–66	1885	BP&C	4-4-0T	2674–2675	B	all services
67–70	1891	N&C	0-4-4T	4352–4355	C	all services
71–72	1895	SS&C	2-4-0T	4055–4056	D	Aylesbury/Verney Junction
73–76	1895	SS&C	2-4-0T	4075–4078	D	Aylesbury/Verney Junction
77–78	1896	MR	0-4-4T		E	Aylesbury line; 77 to LT L46
79	1897	MR	0-4-4T		E	renumbered 1
79–80	1900	RWHL	0-4-4T	2474–2475	E	Aylesbury line; 80 to LT L47
81–82	1901	RWHL	0-4-4T	2476–2477	E	Aylesbury line; 81 to LT L48
90–93	1901	YEC	0-6-2T	624–627	F	heavy work; to LT L49-L52
94–95	1915	YEC	0-6-4T		G	express passenger
96–97	1916	YEC	0-6-4T		G	express passenger
100	1886	HC&C	0-4-0ST		S	shunter; 1884?
101	1897	P&C	0-6-0ST	664	S	Finchley Road shunting; to LT L53
102	1899	P&C	0-6-0ST	823	S	Finchley Road shunting; to LT L54
103–106	1920	KS&C	4-4-4T	4088–4091	H	express passenger; to LNER H2 6415-6418, 1935
107–110	1921	KS&C	4-4-4T	4092–4095	H	express passenger; to LNER H2 6419-6422, 1935
111–116	1924	AW&C	2-6-4T		K	goods; to LNER L2 6158-6163, 1935; similar to the SECR K Class and designed by Richard Maunsell

Builders
AW&C	Armstrong Whitworth and Company	Elswick, Newcastle upon Tyne
BP&C	Beyer, Peacock and Company	Gorton, Manchester
HC&C	Hudswell Clarke and Company	Hunslet, Leeds, West Yorkshire
KS&C	Kerr, Stuart and Company	Stoke-on-Trent
MR	Metropolitan Railway	Neasden Works
N&C	Neilson and Company	Glasgow, Scotland
P&C	Peckett & Company	St. George, Bristol
RWHL	R. & W. Hawthorne, Leslie and Company	Newcastle upon Tyne
SS&C	Sharp, Stewart and Company	Manchester
WEC	Worcester Engine Company	Worcester
YEC	Yorkshire Engine Company	Sheffield

== See also ==
- District Railway steam locomotives
