= District Railway steam locomotives =

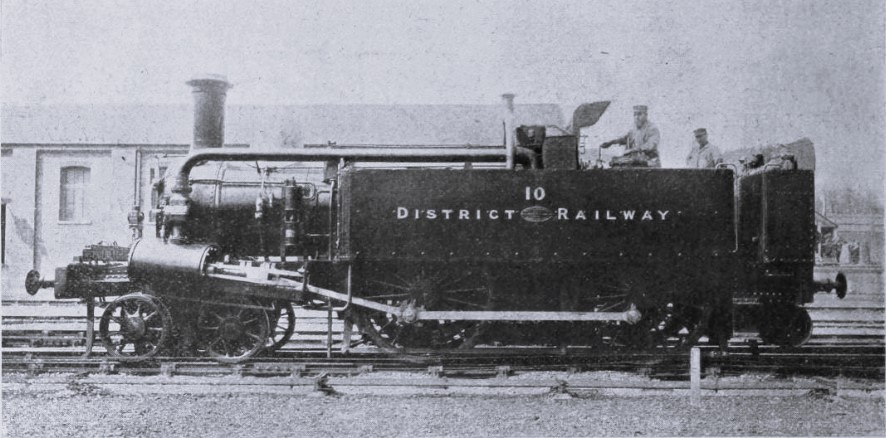
District Railway locomotive No. 10

District Railway steam locomotives were used on London's Metropolitan District Railway (commonly known as the District Railway). When in 1871 the railway needed its own locomotives, they ordered twenty four condensing steam locomotives from Beyer Peacock similar to the A Class locomotives the Metropolitan Railway was using on the route. As they were intended for an underground railway, the locomotives did not have cabs, but had a weatherboard with a bent-back top and the back plate of the bunker was raised to provide protection when running bunker first.

A total of fifty four locomotives were purchased and still in service in 1905 when the line was electrified, but by 1907 all but six of the steam locomotives had been sold. By 1925 two locomotives remained for departmental use and in the following year one of these was replaced by a Metropolitan Railway A Class. Both were replaced in 1931 by two 0-6-0T goods locomotives bought from the Hunslet Engine Company.

== History ==
When in 1871 the District Railway needed its own locomotives, they ordered 24 condensing steam locomotives from Beyer Peacock similar to the A Class locomotives the Metropolitan Railway was using on the route. The 4-4-0 tank locomotives had 16 inches (410 mm) x 20 inches (510 mm) cylinders, 5 feet 0 1/2 inch (1.537 m) diameter driving wheels and weighed 42 ton 3 cwt in working order. The boiler pressure was 120 psi (830 kPa), the front wheels were on a Bissel truck and fitted with 40 cubic feet (1.1 m^{3}) bunker. As they were intended for an underground railway, the locomotives did not have cabs. To reduce smoke underground, at first the Metropolitan had used coke, but after 1869 this was changed to smokeless Welsh coal. The only obvious differences were a different chimney style and a bent-back top to the weatherboard, and the back plate of the bunker was raised to provide protection when running bunker first.

Later locomotives had an Adams bogie in place of the Bissel truck and earlier locomotives modified. A total of fifty four locomotives were purchased and still in service in 1905 when the line was electrified.

After the railway had been electrified by 1907 all but six of the steam locomotives had been sold. By 1925 two locomotives (No. 33 and No 34) had been retained for departmental use. In 1926 No. 33 was scrapped and replaced by Metropolitan Railway A Class No. 22, which became District No. 35.

These were replaced in 1931 by two 0-6-0T goods locomotives bought from the Hunslet Engine Company. They passed to London Transport in 1933 were numbered L.30 and L.31 and subsequently withdrawn in 1963.

== Numbering ==
Nos	Work Nos	Date Built	Comments,
1-24	1063-1086	1871	
25-30	1612-1617	1876	
31-36	2053-2058	1880	
37-42	2298-2303	1883	
43-48	2584-2589	1884	
49-54	2776-2781	1886	

== See also ==
- Metropolitan Railway steam locomotives
