= Automation of the London Underground =

Automation of London Underground rolling stock has been partially implemented since the introduction of automatic train operation on the Hainault to Woodford section of the Central line in 1964. It is currently in use on eight lines.

== Historical projects ==
Partially automated trains using automatic train operation (ATO) have been used on passenger services on the Victoria line since 1968. The side doors to the driver's cab were sealed, so that access was normally through the passenger saloon. Since the trains were to be operated by one person, the door controls were moved from the rear end of the motor car into the cab. The train control equipment was fitted beneath the centre seats, and consisted of a "black box", which interpreted signals received from the running rails. These were picked up by sensing coils mounted on the leading bogie. One rail supplied safety information, which was received continuously. Any failure to obtain this data resulted in a trip-valve operating, which stopped the train. The second rail supplied signal commands, which included speed signals and instructions to start and stop the train. This information was only provided when it was needed. The driver was renamed a train operator, and was responsible for opening and closing the doors at stations, and initiating a start from the stations, by pressing two buttons simultaneously. All other operation, including stopping at signals and restarting when safe to proceed was automatic. The automatic control equipment was temporarily mounted in the passenger saloon, between the cab and the first set of doors, to enable engineers to monitor and adjust it as experience was gained.

== Current status ==
Partially-automated trains are used on eight lines: Victoria, Jubilee, Central, Northern, District, Circle, Hammersmith and City, Metropolitan. These trains still require operators to open and close the doors, and to assist in the event of an emergency. This method of working is also used on the Thameslink core and is used on the Elizabeth line.

London's second rapid-transit system, the Docklands Light Railway (DLR), has operated with driverless trains since its opening in 1987.

Boris Johnson promised in 2012 that there would be driverless Tube trains within 10 years. During his campaign to be re-elected as London Mayor, he said "TfL (Transport for London) will rapidly establish a timetable for introducing the first driverless trains to become operational on the London Underground network within a decade". That was cheered by Brian Paddick (Lib Dems), but Ken Livingstone (Labour) said it was a 'vanity project', and Jenny Jones (Greens) said that she had concerns over the safety of driverless trains.

The then deputy cabinet member for sports, leisure and customer services at Westminster City Council, Richard Holloway, launched a petition in August 2015 demanding the introduction of driverless trains.

== Benefits and drawbacks ==
=== Possible benefits ===
- It would save the cost of drivers' salaries and benefits.
- It removes the possibility of strikes by drivers, which have caused widespread disruption, as well as the possibility of a driver being ill or otherwise unable to work at short notice.
- In Paris, automated metros have enabled trains to run every 85 seconds and this increase in services could be replicated on the Tube.
- It would enable easier running of the Night Tube, as drivers would not have to work anti-social hours and have to concentrate at times when they might be tired.
- Trains would not have to have a driver's compartment, reducing weight and the cost of building trains.

=== Criticism ===
- There has been criticism from unions over safety and cost, as well as the accompanying reductions in staffing levels.
- It is more difficult to introduce driverless trains on existing lines (as opposed to new lines such as the DLR) as there are issues with signalling when there are both trains with drivers and without running at the same time.
- Christian Wolmar has written that, as Tube lines were not built with escape routes for passengers, in an emergency the passengers must be led away from the train by staff; he argues that this means there must still be a "train captain" on board, negating some of the benefits of driverless trains.

== New Tube for London programme ==
The New Tube for London programme will include the ability to have driverless tube trains, however in 2024 the Mayor of London confirmed that no plans for driverless trains would be progressed.

== See also ==
- List of automated urban metro subway systems
- London Underground
- Automatic Train Operation
