= Metropolitan Railway E Class =

Class of 7 British 0-4-4T locomotives

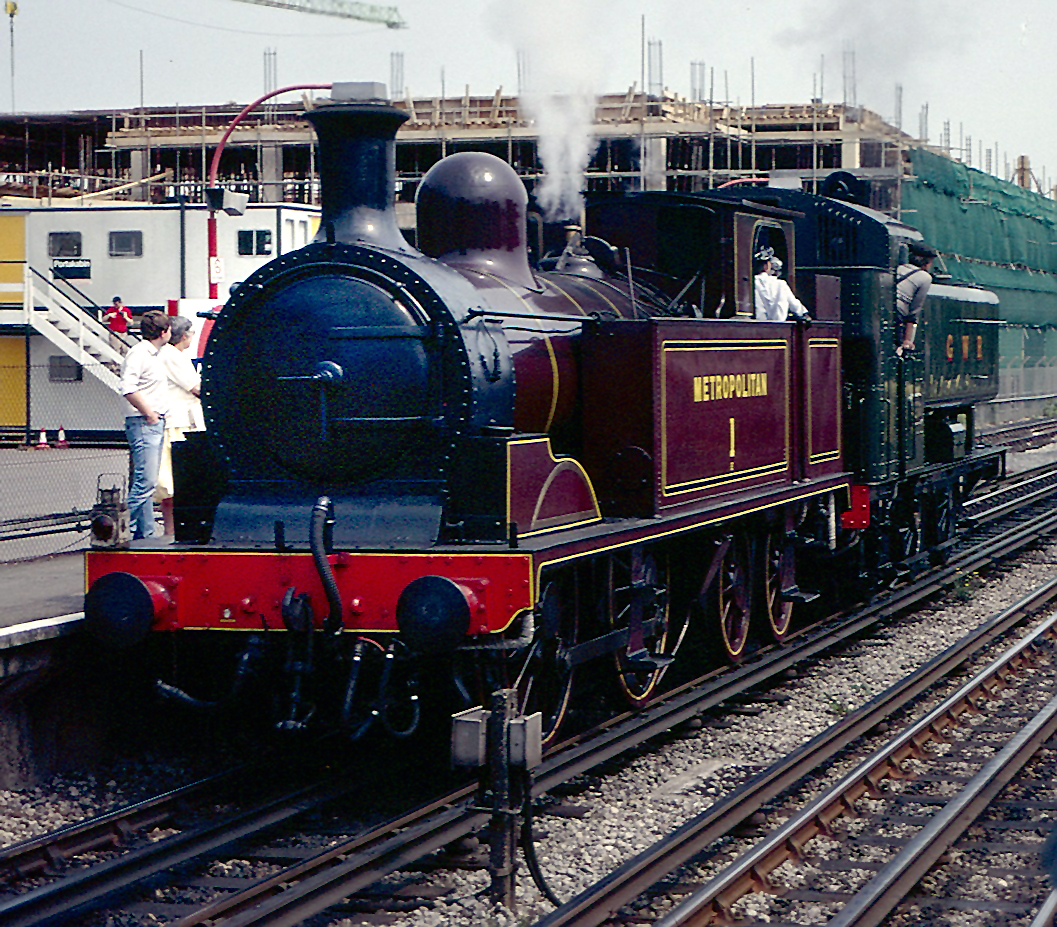
- No 1 at Amersham, 1990
Type and origin
- Power type: Steam
- Builder: Metropolitan Railway's Neasden Works (3), Hawthorn Leslie and Company (4)
- Serial number: HL: 2474–2477
- Build date: 1896–1901
- Total produced: 7
Specifications
- Configuration
  - Whyte: 0-4-4T
  - UIC: B2′ n2t
- Gauge: 4 ft 8 1/2 in (1,435 mm) standard gauge
- Fuel type: Coal
Career
- Operators: Metropolitan Railway
- Numbers: 77–78, 79 (renumbered 1), 79–82
- Preserved: No. 1
- Disposition: One preserved, remainder scrapped.

The Metropolitan Railway E Class is a class of 0-4-4T steam locomotives. A total of seven locomotives were built between 1896 and 1901 for the Metropolitan Railway: three by the railway at their Neasden Works and four by Hawthorn Leslie and Company in Newcastle upon Tyne.

== Overview ==
One locomotive became Metropolitan Railway No.1 and was a replacement for A Class (4-4-0T) No.1 which had been scrapped after an accident. The other locomotives were numbered 77 to 82. Number 77 is known to have been fitted with condensing apparatus. It is likely that condensing apparatus was originally fitted to the whole class, but later removed.

== Displacement ==
The E Class were displaced from the main passenger trains by the 4-4-4T H Class in 1920, moving to lesser jobs such as trains on the Chesham branch, goods trains and engineering duties. Following the Second World War, one E Class locomotive was regularly stationed at Rickmansworth station to cover a failure of LNER locomotives working Metropolitan Line trains north of this point.

== London Transport ==
The first locomotive was scrapped in 1935 before it could be given a new London Transport number, something that only four locomotives would receive. No.1 became L44, while numbers. 77, 80 and 81 became L46–L48.

== Preservation ==
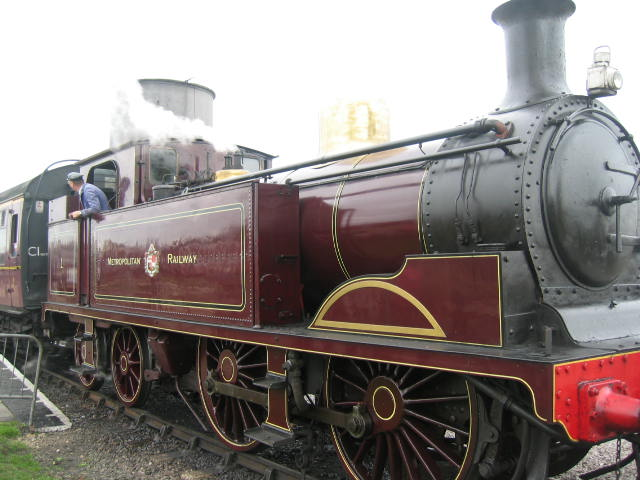
Metropolitan Railway 0-4-4T E Class No. 1

L44 (No. 1) worked the last steam-hauled LT passenger train in 1961, and survived in use until 1965; it is now preserved at the Buckinghamshire Railway Centre.

L44 was preserved by a 19 year old London Transport Mechanical Engineering Apprentice Jim Stringer, who started the Met Tank Appeal Fund in 1962. The original objective was to save the only remaining 0-6-2T 'F' Class locomotive numbered L52 in the London Transport fleet. LT offered this locomotive to him for £500. The Met Tank Appeal Fund raised just over £1,000, but when Stringer went to hand over the cheque he was advised that an inspection had revealed a cracked mainframe, and the locomotive could no longer be 'steamed', and therefore no longer suitable for preservation. However, he was offered L44 in its place for the sum of £450.

Stringer was helped by committee members of the London Railway Preservation Society, and a locomotive fitter named Gerald Fitzgerald. The LRPS had storage for the locomotive at Bishops Stortford, and also at Luton where it was subsequently moved to, but the Quainton Railway Society offered a secure and permanent base for it at their newly established museum in Buckinghamshire. L44 (now correctly referred to as Met Loco No. 1) was moved there in the mid-1960s. No. 1 was maintained in main-line condition and was occasionally on its old lines during the "Steam on the Met" events which took place between 1989 and 2000. It received a full overhaul in 2001.

In 2007, No. 1 made its first visit away from Buckinghamshire Railway Centre since the 2001 heavy overhaul, arriving at the Bluebell Railway on 24 July in order to take part in the "Bluebell 125" celebrations. While there, it was paired with four original Metropolitan Railway carriages that were restored by the Bluebell. During August 2008, it visited Barrow Hill, and it travelled to Llangollen in October 2008 to participate in their heritage events.

In 2010, an appeal was launched to fund the restoration of Number 1, and to fund its continued upkeep for the following ten years to enable it to participate in future heritage events.

In 2013 for the 150th Anniversary of London Underground, No. 1 was loaned to the LT museum for several trips between Olympia and Moorgate via Edgware Road on successive weekends in January of that year to honour the actual anniversary of the first underground journey from Paddington (Bishop's Road) to Farringdon on 9 January 1863. The train was made up of Metropolitan Locomotive Number 1, Metropolitan Railway Milk Van Number 4, and the Metropolitan Railway Jubilee Carriage 353 (the oldest surviving operational tube carriage dating from 1892), both the property of the London Transport Museum. Coupled to these were the set of four 'Ashbury' Coaches of 1898 (ex Chesham Shuttle coaches 387, 412, 394 and 368, on loan from the Bluebell Railway) and Metropolitan Electric Railway Locomotive Number 12 Sarah Siddons, owned by London Underground Limited. Several preservation bodies were involved in providing or restoring the rolling stock for the event and the operation was given added impetus by the enthusiastic support of then London Mayor Boris Johnson and his commissioner of Transport for London, Sir Peter Hendy CBE, himself a Transport enthusiast.

The following year, No. 1 pulled a similar combination of carriages along with Sarah Siddons along the route of the Hammersmith & City Line on successive weekends in August to mark the 150th Anniversary of the opening of the Hammersmith and City Railway. On 22–23 June 2019, No. 1 steamed along a stretch of the District Line as part of celebrations marking the 150th anniversary of the opening of the District Railway in 1868. Rolling stock used included former Metropolitan District Railway coach No. 100. This event was billed as being probably the last time a heritage steam train would be seen in central London on the Underground due to the impending installation of a new signalling system on the network.
