= Metropolitan Railway K Class =

Class of six British 2-6-4T locomotives

Metropolitan Railway K Class LNER Class L2
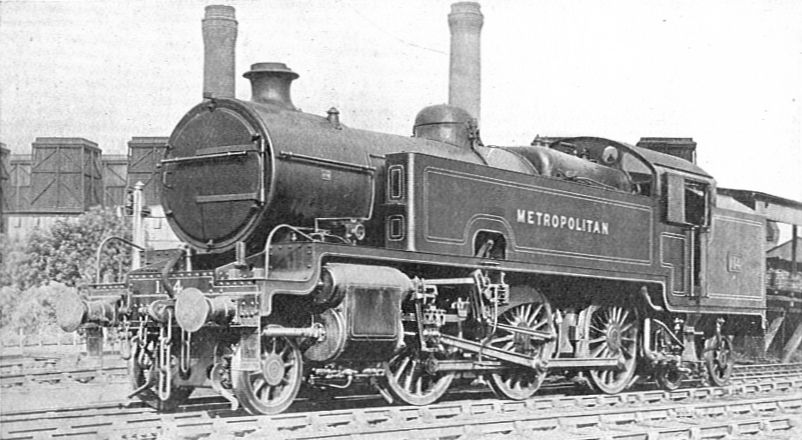
- No. 114, circa 1928
Type and origin
- Power type: Steam
- Builder: Armstrong Whitworth
- Build date: 1925
Specifications
- Configuration
  - Whyte: 2-6-4T
  - UIC: 1'C2'ht
- Leading dia.: 37 in (940 mm)
- Driver dia.: 5 ft 6 in (1,680 mm)
- Trailing dia.: 37 in (940 mm)
- Wheelbase: 36 ft 7 in (11,150 mm)
- Axle load: 18.45 long tons (18.75 t; 20.66 short tons)
- Loco weight: 87.35 long tons (88.75 t; 97.83 short tons)
- Fuel type: Coal
- Fuel capacity: 4.00 long tons (4.06 t; 4.48 short tons)
- Water cap.: 2,000 imp gal (9,100 L; 2,400 US gal)
- Firebox
  - Grate area: 25 sq ft (2.3 m^{2})
- Boiler pressure: 200 psi (1.38 MPa) superheated
- Heating surface
  - Firebox: 135 sq ft (12.5 m^{2})
  - Tubes: 1,017 sq ft (94.5 m^{2})
  - Flues: 356 sq ft (33.1 m^{2})
- Superheater
  - Heating area: 285 sq ft (26.5 m^{2})
- Cylinders: Two, outside
- Cylinder size: 19 in × 28 in (483 mm × 711 mm)
- Valve gear: Walschaerts
- Valve type: 10 in (254 mm) piston valves
Performance figures
- Tractive effort: 26,036 lbf (115.81 kN)
Career
- Operators: Metropolitan Railway; London and North Eastern Railway
- Class: MET: K LNER L2
- Number in class: 6
- Numbers: MET:111–116; LNER 6158–6163
- Retired: 1943–1948
- Disposition: All scrapped

The Metropolitan Railway K Class consisted of six 2-6-4T steam locomotives, numbered 111 to 116.

== Construction ==
They were built by Armstrong Whitworth in 1925, using parts manufactured at the Royal Arsenal, Woolwich, to the design of the South Eastern and Chatham Railway N class 2-6-0 locomotives and part of a family of 200 or so "mogul" engines designed by Richard Maunsell. Final design was by the Metropolitan Railway's George Hally. The boilers had been made by Robert Stephenson and Company of Darlington. Some unusual variations included footsteps below the buffer beam and curved handrails at the front either side of the smokebox.

== Service ==
The K Class were used on heavy freight trains along London's Metropolitan Railway mainline, including coal to the power station at Neasden, although they were used on occasional passenger trains. In 1937, all six were transferred to the London and North Eastern Railway (LNER) where they were based at Neasden (LNER) Shed. The LNER numbered them 6158–6163, and classified them as L2 Class. They were used for passenger services for a short stint in 1938 and 1942 when H2 4-4-4T's were unavailable for maintenance or transferred elsewhere.

== Withdrawal ==
All were withdrawn and scrapped between 1943 and 1948.
