= Condensing steam locomotive =

Type of locomotive designed to recover exhaust steam

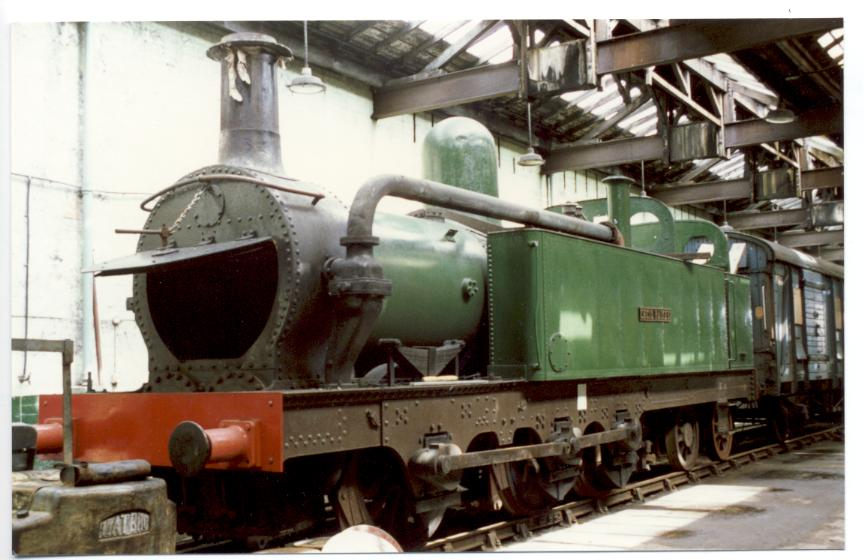
Mersey Railway locomotive Cecil Raikes, showing the prominent exhaust pipes leading back to the water tanks

A condensing steam locomotive is a type of locomotive designed to recover exhaust steam, either in order to improve range between taking on boiler water, or to reduce emission of steam inside enclosed spaces. The apparatus takes the exhaust steam that would normally be used to produce a draft for the firebox, and routes it through a heat exchanger, into the boiler water tanks. Installations vary depending on the purpose, design and the type of locomotive to which it is fitted. It differs from the usual closed cycle condensing steam engine, in that the function of the condenser is primarily either to recover water, or to avoid excessive emissions to the atmosphere, rather than maintaining a vacuum to improve both efficiency and power.

== Thermodynamics ==
Unlike the surface condenser often used on a steam turbine or marine steam engine, the condensing apparatus on a steam locomotive does not normally increase the power output, rather it may decrease considerably due to a reduction of airflow to the firebox that heats the steam boiler. Condensing the steam from a high volume gas to a low volume liquid causes a significant pressure drop at the exhaust, which usually would add additional power in most steam engines. Whilst more power is potentially available by expanding down to a vacuum, the power output is actually greatly reduced compared to a conventional steam locomotive on account of the lower air flow through the firebox, as there is now no waste steam to eject into the firebox exhaust in order to pull more air into the firebox air intake. In order to produce similar power, air to the firebox must be provided by a steam driven or mechanically driven fan. This often cancels out any improvement in efficiency.

The temperature of the exhaust steam is greater than typical stationary or ship-based steam plant of similar power due to having fewer waste recovery stages, as ships often have a compound steam engine with an additional low pressure stage or even a low speed turbine. Waste heat on modern steam plants is often recovered using heat exchangers. However, condensing locomotives do not have this benefit due to the waste heat being expelled to the surrounding air and not being recovered, and therefore none of the energy in the waste steam is recovered to do mechanical work. In many conditions the temperature gradient is often much worse due to using air instead of having an abundant source of cooling water as naval or stationary steam power plants have. The Anderson condensing system significantly reduces these losses by only partially cooling the waste steam before compressing it into condensate, then pumping the high temperature condensate back into the boiler in order to recover the unused waste heat. This greatly reduces energy waste.

Because of the relatively high temperature in a locomotive condenser and the rejection of the heat to the air, the potential improvement in thermal efficiency expected from including the condenser in the cycle is not usually realised within the space constraints of a typical locomotive. Indeed, losses due to viscous friction in the condenser piping, and having to pump the condensate back into the boiler is likely to reduce the power output over what was achievable from simply venting to atmosphere.

These restrictions do not apply to marine or stationary steam engines due to not having size or weight restrictions. Ships often had massive waste steam recovery systems, such as the 400 ton waste steam turbine used to recover very low 6 psi (41 kPa) waste steam on the Titanic and its sister ships. This is several times the weight of an entire locomotive, and so is clearly not feasible as a form of waste steam recovery for locomotives.

== Exhaust draught ==
A drawback of condensing the exhaust steam is that it is no longer available to draw the fire, by use of the blastpipe. The draught must thus be generated instead by a steam-driven fan. Where possible, this has been arranged to use exhaust steam, although in some cases live steam was required, with extra steam and thus fuel consumption.

== Types of condenser ==
Steam locomotive condensers may be water-cooled or air-cooled.

=== Water tank condenser ===
Here, the exhaust steam is blown into cold water in the locomotive's water tanks. A non-return system must be fitted, to prevent water from the tanks being drawn into the cylinders when the steam is shut off. This system was mainly used for locomotives working in tunnels.

=== Air condenser ===
Here, the exhaust steam is blown into an air-cooled radiator, similar to that used for the cooling system of an internal combustion engine. This system was used on small tram engines (where the condenser was mounted on the roof) and on large tender engines (where the condenser was mounted in the tender).

=== Anderson system ===
The Anderson condensing system uses an air-cooled condenser but the steam is only partially condensed to form an aerosol of water droplets in steam. This aerosol is then liquified by pressure, using a specially designed boiler feed pump. A fuel saving of nearly 30% (compared with exhausting to the atmosphere) was claimed for the Anderson system but this seems paradoxical. One would expect a higher fuel consumption because of the power required to compress the aerosol.

The reason this is possible is due to Carnot's theorem, which states that pumping heat requires less energy than producing the heat itself.

A similar effect known as Vapor-compression desalination was later used for desalination of water. Instead of returning the condensate water to the boiler, the hot compressed condensate is passed through a heat exchanger to return heat to the boiler, then released as clean drinking water. It is one of the most efficient processes used to desalinate water.

== Purpose ==
There are two usual reasons for fitting condensing equipment – reducing exhaust emissions and increasing range.

=== Reduced exhaust emissions ===
==== Underground railways ====
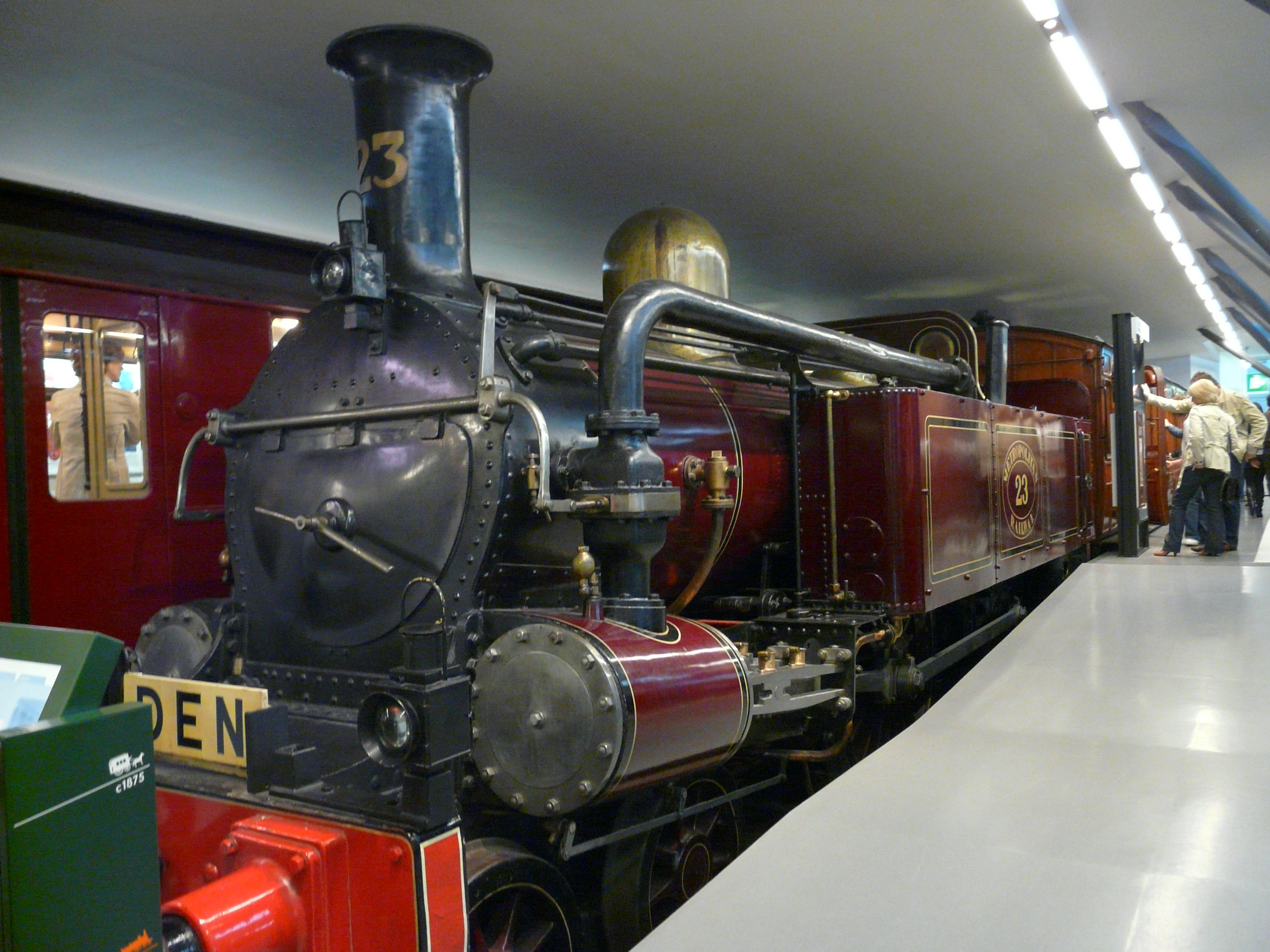
Metropolitan Railway A Class. Note the large valves in the steam return pipes, switching between condensing and non-condensing modes.

Originally developed for the Metropolitan Railway to allow their locomotives to work the tunnels of the London Underground. This system was devised by Daniel Gooch and developed by Beyer, Peacock & Company. Steam is diverted from the exhaust steam pipes into the water tanks via condensing pipes within the same tanks. The water in the tanks could quickly heat up near boiling point, reducing the condensing effect on the exhaust steam. It was not unknown for the tanks to be emptied and refilled with cold water on a regular basis. Ordinary injectors will not work with hot water (until hot-water injectors were developed) so condensing locomotives were usually fitted with axle-driven boiler feedwater pumps. When not working in tunnels, the steam was directed to the blast pipe and up the chimney in the usual way.

==== Roadside tramways ====
In Britain, locomotives working on roadside steam tramways were required by law to have condensers. Water tank condensers (as above) were sometimes used but air-condensers were more common. A steam tram engine usually had a full-length roof and this was surmounted by a nest of air-cooled copper tubes in which the exhaust steam was condensed. Kitson & Company made many engines of this type. The system was satisfactory for tram engines (which were very low-powered) but would not have worked for larger railway locomotives.

=== Increased range ===
Generally this was a more sophisticated installation that used forced air cooling to condense the exhaust steam. The system was intended to reduce the problems of getting enough water to steam locomotives running through desert and very arid areas, e.g. South Africa. (See below)

== Locomotives fitted with a condensing apparatus ==
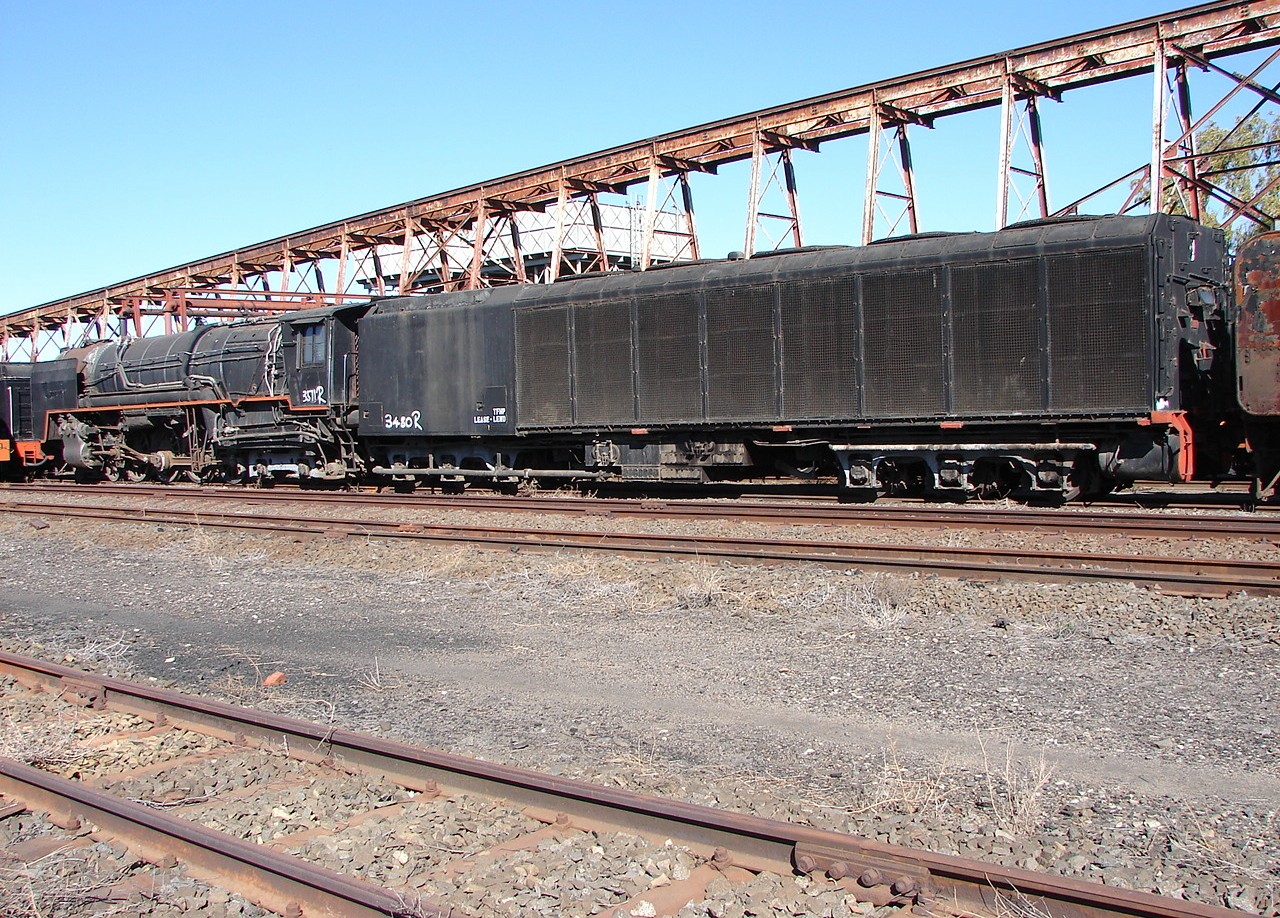
South African Class 25 Note the extremely large tender, with side louvres to cool the condensers

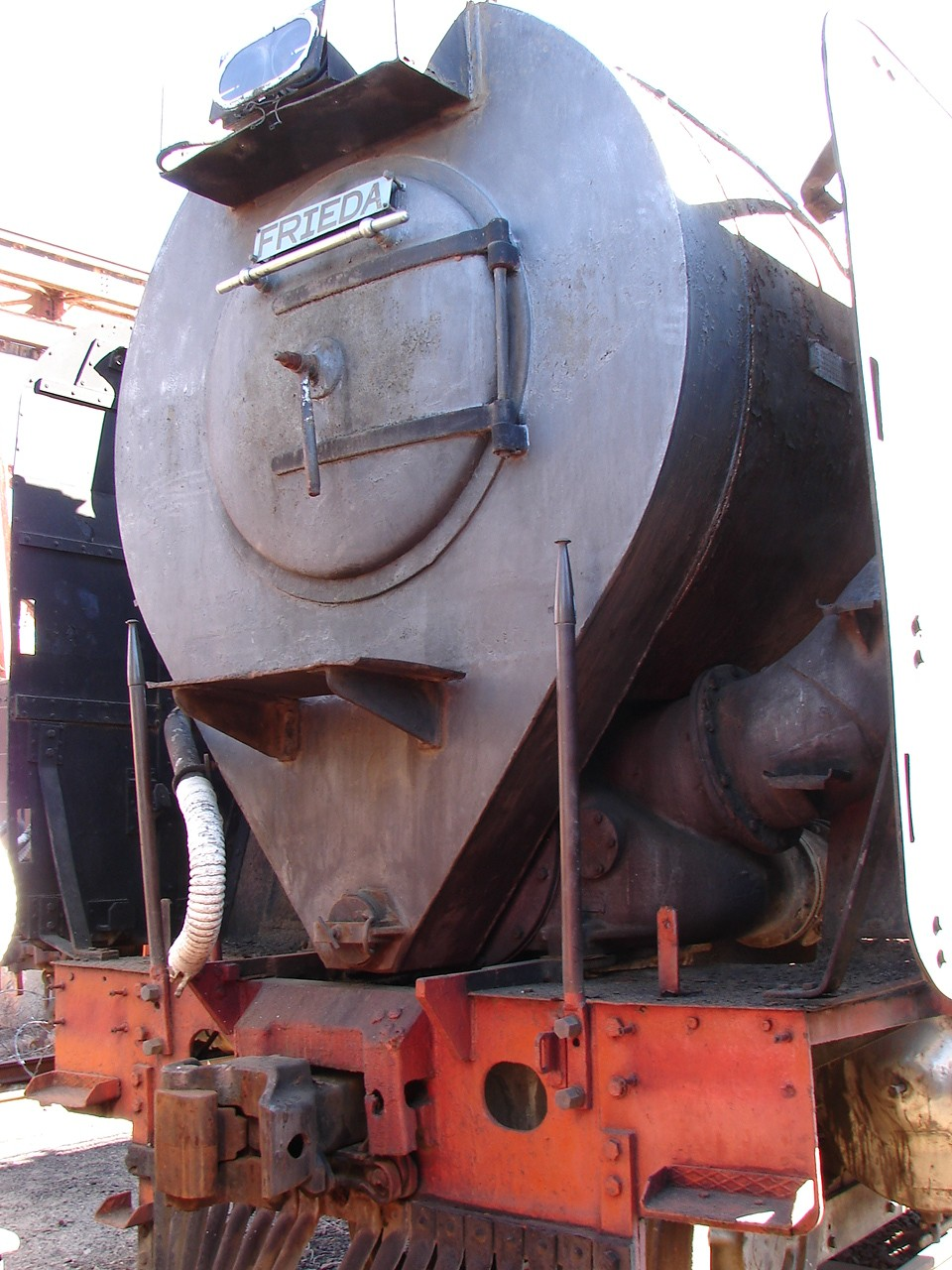
South African Class 25

=== With water tank condensers ===
- Caledonian Railway 0-4-4T
- Central London Railway tube-gauge 0-6-0T
- Great Eastern Railway class G69 2-4-2T
- Great Eastern Railway class L77 0-6-2T
- Great Eastern Railway class M15 2-4-2T
- Great Northern Railway class J13 0-6-0T
- Great Northern Railway class L1 0-8-2T
- Great Northern Railway (later LNER) class N2 0-6-2T
- Great Western Railway Metropolitan Class 2-4-0T
- Great Western Railway 633 class 0-6-0T
- Great Western Railway 9700 class 0-6-0PT (a variation on the 5700 Class)
- London, Chatham and Dover Railway R class 0-4-4T
- LMS Fowler 2-6-2T
- Mersey Railway 0-6-4T No.5 Cecil Raikes (preserved at the Museum of Liverpool)
- Metropolitan Railway A Class 4-4-0T
- Metropolitan Railway B Class 4-4-0T
- Metropolitan Railway C Class 0-4-4T
- Metropolitan Railway D Class 2-4-0T
- Metropolitan Railway E Class 0-4-4T
- Metropolitan District Railway 4-4-0T

=== With tender air condensers ===
- Deutsche Reichsbahn class 52. Around 200 of these were built with condensing tenders, to reduce the visible exhaust plume and so avoid air attacks on the Eastern Front of World War II.
- Russian SO class. From 1936 some of these were built with P11 condensing tenders for use across deserts in Turkestan.
- South African Class 20 2-10-2
- South African Class 25 4-8-4
- South Manchuria Railway Mikaku class 2-8-2

== See also ==
- Jet condenser
- Kirchweger condenser
- Surface condenser
