= Metropolitan Railway G Class =

Class of 4 British 0-6-4T locomotives

Metropolitan Railway G Class LNER Class M2
Type and origin
- Power type: Steam
- Designer: Charles Jones
- Builder: Yorkshire Engine Company
- Build date: 1915
Specifications
- Configuration
  - Whyte: 0-6-4T
- Gauge: 4 ft 8 1/2 in (1,435 mm) standard gauge
- Driver dia.: 5 ft 9 in (1.753 m)
- Trailing dia.: 3 ft 6 in (1.067 m)
- Wheelbase: 28 ft 9 in (8.763 m)
- Axle load: 18.65 long tons (18.95 t; 20.89 short tons)
- Loco weight: 71.05 long tons (72.19 t; 79.58 short tons)
- Fuel type: Coal
- Fuel capacity: 4.5 long tons (4.6 t; 5.0 short tons)
- Water cap.: 2,000 imp gal (9,100 L; 2,400 US gal)
- Firebox
  - Grate area: 21.4 sq ft (1.99 m^{2})
- Boiler pressure: 160 psi (1.1 MPa)
- Heating surface
  - Firebox: 142 sq ft (13.2 m^{2})
  - Tubes: 281 sq ft (26.1 m^{2})
  - Flues: 281 sq ft (26.1 m^{2})
- Superheater
  - Heating area: 197 sq ft (18.3 m^{2})
- Cylinders: 2 (inside)
- Cylinder size: 20 in × 26 in (508 mm × 660 mm)
- Valve gear: Stephenson
Performance figures
- Tractive effort: 20,498 lbf (91.18 kN) (at 85% pressure)
Career
- Operators: Metropolitan Railway; London and North Eastern Railway
- Number in class: 4
- Retired: 1943, 1946 and 1948
- Disposition: All scrapped

The Metropolitan Railway G Class consisted of four 0-6-4T steam locomotives, numbered 94 to 97. They were built by Yorkshire Engine Company in 1915. The class was unusual by having named engines, and were the last Metropolitan steam locomotives to do so.

== Service ==
The G Class had various roles on the Metropolitan mainline until 1937, when all four were transferred to the London and North Eastern Railway (LNER). The LNER renumbered them as 6154–6157 and reclassified them as M2 Class. Two remained in service until the 1946 renumbering, but all were withdrawn and scrapped from 1943 to 1948

== Names and numbers ==
Table of names and numbers
Number	Name	LNER No.	1946 No.	Withdrawn
94	Lord Aberconway	6154	Allocated No. 9075, but withdrawn before re-numbering	1946
95	Robert H. Selbie	6155	9076	1948
96	Charles Jones	6156	9077	1948
97	Brill	6157		1943
