= Metropolitan Railway F Class =

Class of British 0-6-2T steam locomotives

Type and origin
- Power type: Steam
- Builder: Yorkshire Engine Company
- Build date: 1901
Specifications
- Configuration
  - Whyte: 0-6-2T
- Gauge: 4 ft 8 1/2 in (1,435 mm) standard gauge
- Fuel type: Coal
Career
- Operators: Metropolitan Railway
- Retired: 1957–1964
- Disposition: All scrapped

The Metropolitan Railway F class was a class of 0-6-2T side tank steam locomotive. They were based on the earlier E Class. Four locomotives, numbered 90 to 93 were built by Yorkshire Engine Company in 1901. They were later numbered L49 to L52.

== Service ==
The F Class were intended for goods trains over the Metropolitan Railway mainline.

== Withdrawal ==
All remained with London Transport until withdrawal between 1957 and 1962. L52 was planned to be preserved by the Met Tank Appeal Fund, but when it was found it had a cracked mainframe E Class No. 1 was chosen instead.
