= Metropolitan Railway H Class =

Type of steam locomotive

Metropolitan Railway H Class LNER Class H2
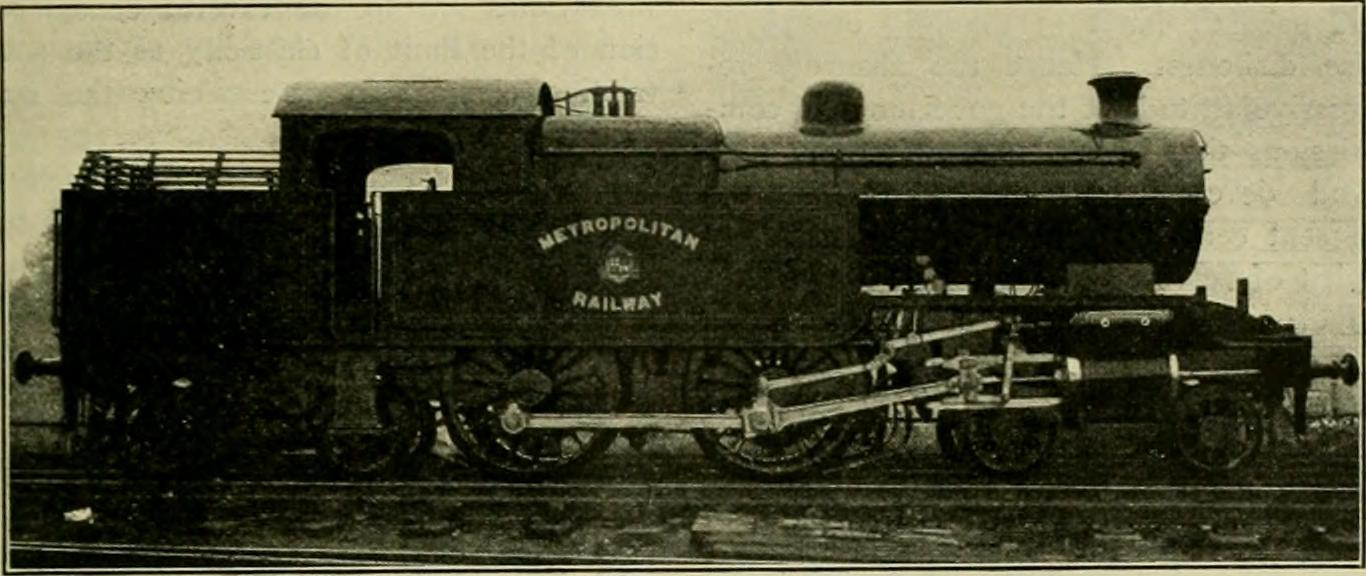
Type and origin
- Power type: Steam
- Designer: Charles Jones
- Builder: Kerr Stuart
- Build date: 1920–1921
- Total produced: 8
Specifications
- Configuration
  - Whyte: 4-4-4T
  - UIC: 2'B2'ht
- Gauge: 4 ft 8 1/2 in (1,435 mm) standard gauge
- Leading dia.: 36 in (914 mm)
- Driver dia.: 69 in (1,753 mm)
- Trailing dia.: 36 in (914 mm)
- Wheelbase: 33.5 ft (10.2 m)
- Length: 41 ft 10 1/2 in (12.764 m)
- Loco weight: 78.25 long tons (79.51 t; 87.64 short tons)
- Fuel type: Coal
- Fuel capacity: 4.00 long tons (4.06 t; 4.48 short tons)
- Water cap.: 2,000 imp gal (9,100 L; 2,400 US gal)
- Firebox
  - Grate area: 21.4 sq ft (1.99 m^{2})
- Boiler pressure: 160 psi (1.1 MPa)
- Heating surface
  - Firebox: 132 sq ft (12.3 m^{2})
  - Tubes: 744 sq ft (69.1 m^{2})
  - Flues: 281 sq ft (26.1 m^{2})
- Superheater
  - Heating area: 164 sq ft (15.2 m^{2})
- Cylinders: Two, outside
- Cylinder size: 19 in × 26 in (483 mm × 660 mm)
Performance figures
- Tractive effort: 18,500 lbf (82 kN)
Career
- Operators: Metropolitan Railway; London and North Eastern Railway
- Class: MET: H LNER: H2
- Numbers: MET: 103–110; LNER: 6415–6422
- Retired: 1942–1947
- Disposition: All scrapped

The Metropolitan Railway H Class consisted of eight 4-4-4T steam locomotives, numbered 103 to 110. They were built by Kerr, Stuart & Co of Stoke on Trent in 1920 at a cost of £11,575 each. A "notable addition" to the Metropolitan Railway, these locomotives were purchased for the express passenger trains on the mainline between Harrow (later Rickmansworth)—the change point from electric locomotives—and Aylesbury or Verney Junction.

== Overview ==
They were designed by The Met's Locomotive & Chief Electrical Engineer, Charles Jones. Delivered between October 1920 and June 1921, they allowed for the retirement of a like number of 0-4-4T C Class and 2-4-0T D Class locomotives. The H Class were considered to be good engines well-suited to the express trains they worked, allowing for a reduction in running times of up to six minutes. They were designed with a hauling capacity of 250 long tons (250 t; 280 short tons) and could negotiate curves of 300 feet (91 m) radius.

== Transfer to LNER ==
When the steam-hauled services were transferred from London Transport to the London and North Eastern Railway in 1937, all eight H Class locomotives were included to continue working the same trains. The LNER numbered them 6415–6422 and classified them as H2 Class. In the 1940s, they were moved from Neasden (LNER) shed to the Nottingham area and worked over other parts of the former Great Central Railway system.

== Withdrawal ==
All were withdrawn and scrapped between 1942 and 1947.
