= Metropolitan Railway C Class =

Class of British steam locomotives (1891)

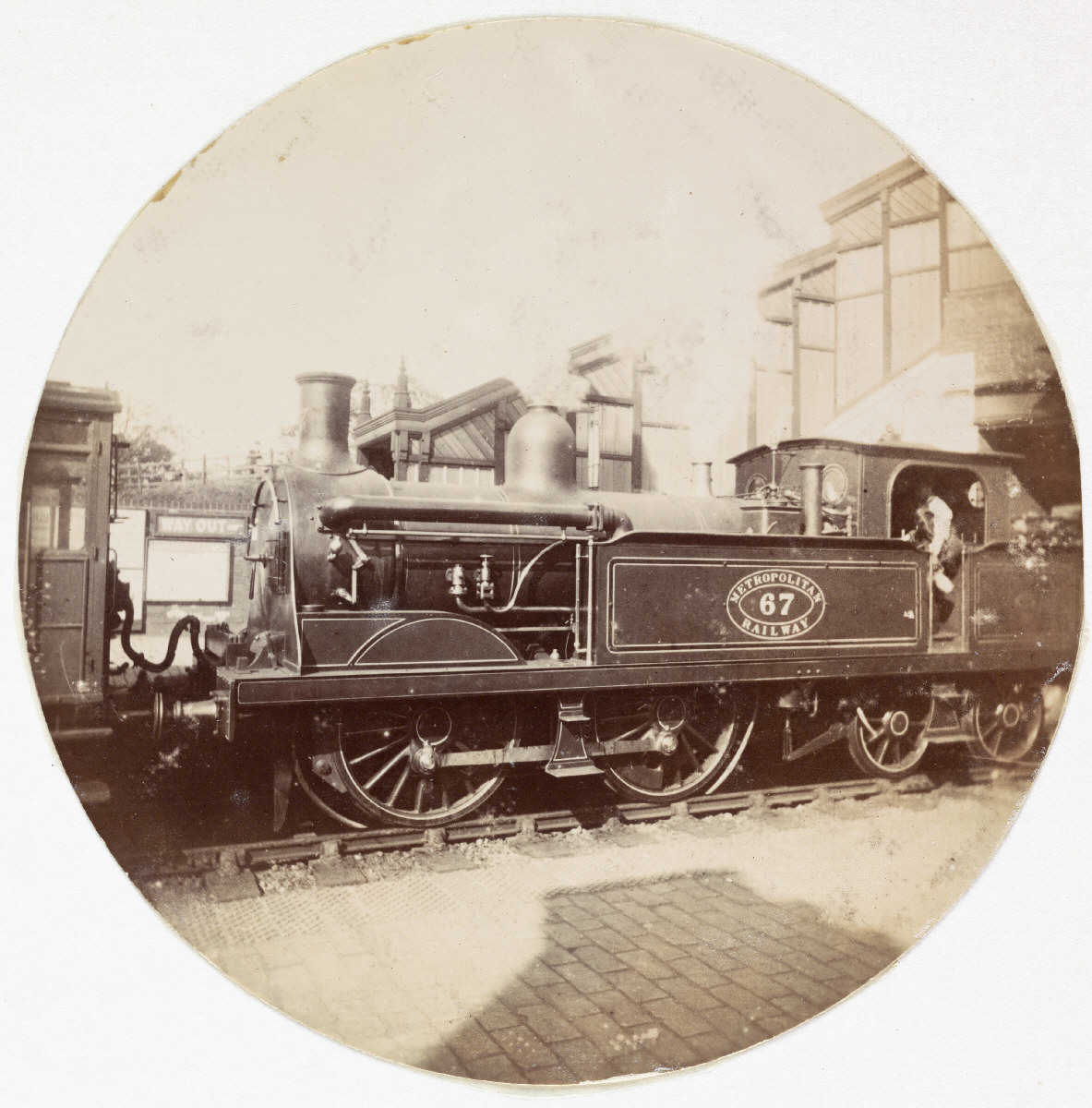
Type and origin
- Power type: Steam
- Builder: Neilson and Company
- Serial number: 4352–4355
- Build date: 1891
- Total produced: 4
Specifications
- Configuration
  - Whyte: 0-4-4T
  - UIC: B2′ n2t
- Gauge: 4 ft 8 1/2 in (1,435 mm)
- Fuel type: Coal
- Cylinders: Two, inside
Career
- Operators: Metropolitan Railway
- Class: C class
- Number in class: 4
- Numbers: 67-70
- Disposition: No. 69 sold around 1920, others scrapped

The Metropolitan Railway C class was a group of four 0-4-4T steam tank locomotives built in 1891 by Neilson and Company. They were to a design by James Stirling, originally the Q class of the South Eastern Railway, and were fitted with condensing apparatus for working in tunnels.

The Neilson works numbers were 4352–5, they were delivered in June 1891 as Metropolitan Railway nos. 67–70. Larger boilers were fitted during 1901–03, with the pressure increased to 150 pounds-force per square inch (1,030 kPa) as compared the 140 lbf/in^{2} (965 kPa) of the original boilers. No. 67 was sold in 1917 to the Ministry of Munitions; the others were sold in 1923 to Charles Williams of Morriston.
