= Metropolitan Railway A Class =

Class of English steam locomotive

Metropolitan Railway A Class and B Class (Including other 'Metropolitan' Pattern Beyer Peacock 4-4-0T's)
- Metropolitan A Class No. 27
Type and origin
- Power type: Steam
- Builder: Beyer, Peacock and Company
- Build date: 1864-1870 (A Class); 1879-1885 (B Class)
Specifications
- Configuration
  - Whyte: 4-4-0T
- Gauge: 4 ft 8 1/2 in (1,435 mm) standard gauge
- Leading dia.: 3 ft (914 mm)
- Driver dia.: 5 ft 0.5 in (1,537 mm) (as built); 5 ft 10 in (1,778 mm) (rebuilt)
- Wheelbase: 20 ft 9 in (6,325 mm)
  - Coupled: 8 ft 10 in (2,692 mm) (A Class); 8 ft 1 in (2,464 mm) (B Class)
- Axle load: 15.475 long tons (15.723 t; 17.332 short tons)
- Loco weight: 42.1–45.2 long tons (42.8–45.9 t; 47.2–50.6 short tons)
- Fuel type: Coke, Coal
- Water cap.: 1,000 imp gal (4,500 L; 1,200 US gal) (A Class); 1,140 imp gal (5,200 L; 1,370 US gal) (B Class)
- Boiler pressure: 120–130 psi (8.3–9.0 bar; 830–900 kPa) (new); 150 psi (10 bar; 1,000 kPa) (modified)
- Heating surface
  - Firebox: 101.2 sq ft (9 m^{2})
  - Tubes: 912.6 sq ft (85 m^{2})
- Cylinders: 2
- Cylinder size: 16 in × 20 in (406 mm × 508 mm) (as built); 17.5 in × 20 in (444 mm × 508 mm) (rebuilt)
Performance figures
- Tractive effort: 8,632 lbf (38.40 kN)-9,351 lbf (41.60 kN) (new); 11,156 lbf (49.62 kN) (rebuilt)
Career
- Operators: Metropolitan Railway; District Railway; London and South Western Railway; London and North Western Railway; Midland Railway; Mersey Railway; Pelaw Main Colliery; West Somerset Mineral Railway; Nidd Valley Railway; Cambrian Railways; North Wales Granite Co.; Tudela and Bilbao Railway (Spain); Madrid Sugar Co. (Spain); Basconia Steelworks (Spain); Rhenish Railway Company (Germany)
- Number in class: 148 (Metropolitan & District Total); 40 (Metropolitan A Class); 26 (Metropolitan B Class)
- Retired: 1935 (revenue service) - L45 Retained as shunter until 1948.
- Disposition: One Metropolitan example preserved, one Bilbao & Tudela example preserved, remainder scrapped

The Metropolitan Railway A Class and B Class are 4-4-0T condensing steam locomotives built for the Metropolitan Railway by Beyer Peacock, first used in 1864. A total of 40 A Class and 26 of the slightly different B Class were delivered by 1885. Used underground, the locomotives condensed their steam, and coke or smokeless coal was burnt to reduce the smoke.

Most locomotives were withdrawn after electrification in the early 20th century, forty having been sold by 1907. The last one was withdrawn in 1948, and is now preserved at the London Transport Museum.

== History ==
=== Construction ===
When the Metropolitan Railway (Met) opened in 1863, the Great Western Railway (GWR) provided the services with their Metropolitan Class locomotives. However, the GWR withdrew their services in August 1863, and the Met bought their own locomotives, which needed to condense as the line from Paddingdon to Farringdon was underground. A tender was received from Beyer, Peacock and Company of Manchester for building eighteen locomotives at £2,600 each that would be available in six months. The design of the locomotives is frequently attributed to the Metropolitan Engineer John Fowler, but the design was a development of a locomotive Beyers had built for the Spanish Tudela-Bilbao railway, Fowler only specifying the driving wheel diameter, axle weight and the ability to navigate sharp curves.

The 4-4-0T locomotives delivered in 1864 had 16 in × 20 in (406 mm × 508 mm) cylinders, 5 feet 0 1/2 inch (1.537 m) diameter driving wheels and weighed 42 ton 3 cwt in working order. The boiler pressure was 120 psi (830 kPa), the front wheels were on a Bissel truck and fitted with 40 cubic feet (1.1 m^{3}) bunker. As they were intended for an underground railway, the locomotives did not have cabs, just a simple spectacle plate. To reduce smoke underground, at first coke was burnt, changed in 1869 to smokeless Welsh coal.

The first 18 locomotives originally carried names, although the nameplates were withdrawn during overhaul.

1	Jupiter	4	Mercury	7	Orion	10	Cerberus	13	Daphne	16	Achilles
2	Mars	5	Apollo	8	Pluto	11	Latona	14	Dido	17	Ixion
3	Juno	6	Medusa	9	Minerva	12	Cyclops	15	Aurora	18	Hercules

These were followed by five more each year from 1866 to 1868, and six in 1869. These were supplied with a tender capacity of 67 cubic feet (1.9 m^{3}); after 1868 the boiler pressure had been increased to 130 psi (900 kPa). From 1879 more locomotives were needed, and these were a modified design, with Adams bogies, and the wheelbase was 8 feet 1 inch (2.46 m), shorter than the previous locomotives at 8 feet 10 inches (2.69 m). A total of 24 of these later locomotives were delivered between 1879 and 1885.

The locomotives were numbered in sequence as they arrived, and in 1925 the examples built before 1870 were classified as A Class and those built after 1879 as B Class. When five Burnett 0-6-0 tank locomotives were received in 1868 for the St John's Wood Railway, they took the numbers 34-38, so the A Class consisted of Nos. 1-33 and 39-44. After the 0-6-0Ts were sold, the B Class reused the earlier numbers, becoming Nos. 34-38 and 50-66.

=== Running ===
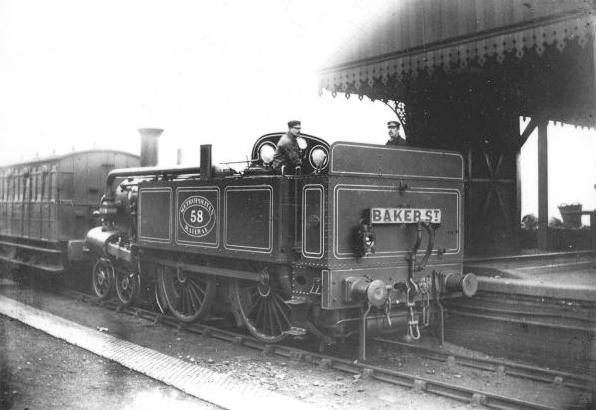
Metropolitan B Class No. 58 at West Hampstead station, destination 'BAKER ST', 1897

Between 1880 and 1885, seventeen locomotives were reboilered at Edgware Road, and after 1886 this was done at Neasden Depot. At Neasden boiler pressure was increased to 150 pounds per square inch (1,000 kPa), and after 1894 the wheel diameter was increased to 5 feet 10 inches (1.78 m) and the cylinders increased to 17 1/2 inches (440 mm). Cabs were fitted after 1895, although these became too hot when working in tunnels and were not popular with crews.

Broken coupling rods were a cause of accidents in 1873 and 1884, and in 1885 the cross section was increased. The problem was eventually solved in 1893 when the original Allan motion was replaced by a Gibson & Lilley link motion, this being fitted to all locomotives by 1896.

In 1898, No. 62 was experimentally fitted to burn oil, but oil of the right quality for underground use was too expensive. In 1921, further experiments were carried out with oil burning.

The Metropolitan Railway A and B Class locomotives worked the whole of the Metropolitan Railway. In 1884, most of the locomotives up to No. 20 were stabled at Neasden, Nos. 27 to 33 were used on the East London Railway, the others from 21 to 50 were at Edgware Road and 51 to 66 at Hammersmith for the Hammersmith & City line.

=== Withdrawal ===
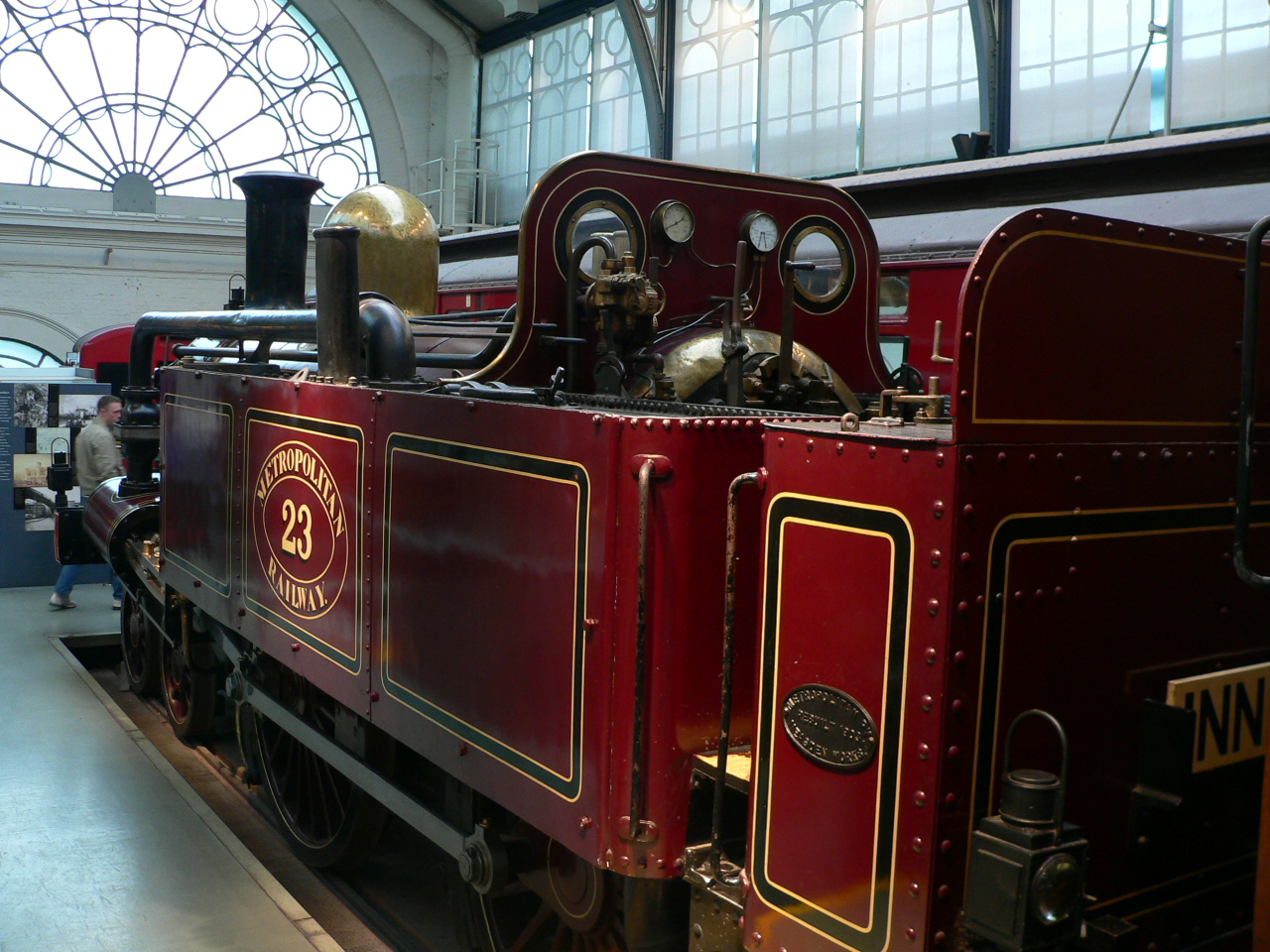
Preserved A Class No. 23 at the London Transport Museum

After electrification of the inner London lines in 1905-06, most of the locomotives were redundant. By 1907, forty had been sold or scrapped, No. 1 having been withdrawn earlier in 1897 after it was involved in an accident at Baker Street. Many locomotives went to R. Fraser and Sons for scrap by 1914, thirteen locomotives having been retained for shunting, departmental work and working trains over the Brill Tramway. The purchase of other locomotives, the closure of the Brill Tramway in 1935, and the transfer of freight duties to the LNER saw all but one of these remaining locomotives sold or scrapped around 1936. Class A No. 23 (LT No. L45) survived as a shunter at Neasden until 1948, and is now preserved at the London Transport Museum.

No. 22 was sold to the District Railway in 1925 and scrapped in 1931. Some of the sold locomotives survived a little longer: No. 7, sold to the Mersey Railway, was withdrawn in 1939, and No. 44 was sold to Pelaw Main Colliery in Durham and survived until 1948.

== Livery ==
Originally, the locomotives were bright olive green lined in black and yellow. Chimneys were copper-capped with the number in brass figures at the front. The domes were also polished brass. It was in 1885 that the colour changed to dark red, known as Midcared, and the domes painted. Midcared was to remain the standard colour, and was carried on by London Transport in 1933.

== Other companies ==
Beyer Peacock built a number of 4-4-0T locomotives to the same basic 'Metropolitan' design, such as for the London and South Western Railway and the Midland Railway, with others being sold on by the Metropolitan to other railway companies including those mentioned previously. The following British companies owned and operated these tank engines, either from new or second hand from the Metropolitan (Excluding the District-owned machines):

Railway	Quantity	Notes
Cambrian Railways	6	Five at £500 each, one at £550. Two (Cambrian nos. 34 and 36) subsequently converted to tender locomotives.
Great Western Railway	6	Inherited from the Cambrian and allocated Nos.1129-32 for the tanks and 1113-4 for the tender conversions. Only 1130 carried its GWR number, the rest having been scrapped by the end of January 1923.
London and North Western Railway	16	Ordered new from Beyer Peacock in 1871. Some were later rebuilt as 4-4-2Ts.
London and South Western Railway	12	Ordered new from Beyer Peacock in 1875, as the 318 Class, for £3160 each.
Mersey Railway	2	Purchased from the Metropolitan Railway for £666 each.
Midland Railway	6	Ordered new from Beyer Peacock in 1868 for £2600 each.
Nidd Valley Railway	2	Purchased from the Metropolitan Railway for £625 each.
North Wales Granite Co.	1	Purchased from the Nidd Valley Railway.
Pelaw Main Colliery	1	Purchased from the Metropolitan Railway for £700.
South Eastern Railway	3	Whilst still under construction in April 1880, Met nos. 57–59 were sold to the SER for £2,045 each (or £2,150 each), becoming SER nos. 299–301. They were repurchased from the SER by the Met in November 1883 for £1,900 each, regaining their original Met numbers.
West Somerset Mineral Railway	1	Purchased from the Metropolitan Railway

- Sir Arthur Elvin is reported as purchasing two from the Metropolitan Railway for £190 each.

== Overseas ==
As well as working in Britain, examples of the same basic pattern of Beyer Peacock 4-4-0Ts are known to have operated in Spain, on the Tudela–Bilbao Railway, and in Germany, on the Rheinische Eisenbahn (Rhine Railway). The eight Spanish examples were ordered from Beyer Peacock in 1862, before the first Metropolitan Railway examples, and later passed into industrial use. Five were purchased by the Rheinische Eisenbahn.

In 1877, the New South Wales Government Railways (NSWGR) ordered 34 locomotives with tenders based on this design from Beyer Peacock. Another 26 were built by Dubs and Co., and a further eight were made in Australia by Atlas Engineering in Sydney. Of these, 20 were rebuilt as 4-4-2T between 1896 and 1902 for suburban workings.

Tudela–Bilbao Railway	8
Rheinische Eisenbahn	5
NSWGR	34
