= Fixing =

Fixing may refer to:

- The present participle of the verb "to fix", an action meaning maintenance, repair, and operations
- "fixing someone up" in the context of arranging or finding a social date for someone
- "Fixing", craving an addictive drug, hence "getting your fix" or "jonesing" (from the 1960s)
- Match fixing, to illegally predetermine the outcome of a sporting event or other contest, also can be referred to as "the fix" as in the common phrase "the fix is in"
- Price fixing, an agreement between business competitors to sell the same product or service at the same price

== Science and medicine ==
- Spaying and neutering, often called "fixing" or the sterilization of an animal

== See also ==
- Fix (disambiguation)
- Fixation (disambiguation)
- Fixed (disambiguation)
- Fixer (disambiguation)
- The Fix (disambiguation)
- The Fix Is In (disambiguation)
