= Fix (surname) =

Fix is a surname. Notable people with the surname include:

- Bernd Fix (born 1962), German computer-security expert
- George Fix (1939–2002), American mathematician
- Helen Fix (1922–2019), American politician
- Josh Fix, South African musician
- Lauren Fix, American automotive expert
- Limor Fix, Israeli electronic-design automation engineer and executive
- Oliver Fix (born 1973), German slalom canoeist
- Paul Fix (1901–1983), American film and television character actor
- Stephen Fix, American academic
- Théodore Fix (1800–1846), French economist

== Fictional characters ==
For fictional bearers of the surname "Fix", see Mr. Fix

== See also ==
- Fixx (surname)
