= Fix =

Fix or FIX may refer to:

== People with the name ==
- Fix (surname)

== Arts, entertainment, and media ==
=== Films ===
- Fix (film), a feature film by Tao Ruspoli

=== Music ===
- Fix (album), 2015 album by Chris Lane
- "Fix" (Blackstreet song), 1997 song by Blackstreet
- "Fix" (Chris Lane song), 2015 song by Chris Lane
- "Fix", a song from industrial metal band Static-X's 1999 album Wisconsin Death Trip

== Business and government ==
- Federal Internet Exchange, network peering points between US agency networks
- Financial Information eXchange, a communications and messaging protocol

== Science and medicine ==
- Factor IX, a coagulation factor
- Spaying and neutering, also called "fixing", sterilization of an animal

== Other uses ==
- Fix (beer), a Greek beer
- Fix (position), a position determined by navigation
- Fix, a term used in problem-solving
- Fix, a term referring to maintenance, repair, and operations
- "Fix", an addictive drug, hence "fixing" or "getting your fix", taking addictive drugs (from the 1960s)
- Fixed point combinator, in mathematics
- Comfort Systems USA, NYSE symbol FIX

== See also ==
- F9 (disambiguation), including a list of topics named F.IX, etc.
- Fixation (disambiguation)
- Fixed (disambiguation)
- Fixer (disambiguation)
- Fixing (disambiguation)
- Fix-up (disambiguation)
- The Fix (disambiguation)
- The Fix Is In (disambiguation)
- Fiks (disambiguation)
