= Fixation =

Fixation may refer to:

== Architecture ==
- Line of fixation, a concept in building design and urban planning

== Computing ==
- Session fixation, a computer security attack

== Food and drink ==
- Fixation Brewing Company, an Australian beer brand owned by Lion, a subsidiary of Kirin

== Law ==
- Fixation in Canadian copyright law, a concept in Canadian copyright law

== Medicine ==
- Complement fixation test, an immunochemical medical test
- Latex fixation test, a microbiological assay

=== Optometry and ophthalmology ===
- Fixation disparity, a vision condition
- Fixation reflex, a visual reflex

=== Orthopedics ===
- External fixation, immobilization of an injury with external hardware
- Internal fixation, immobilization of an injury with surgical implants
- Vertebral fixation, anchoring of spinal vertebrae

== Music ==
- Fixation on a Co-Worker, the 1995 debut studio album from American metalcore band Deadguy
- "Fixation on the Darkness", a song from American metalcore band Killswitch Engage's 2002 album Alive or Just Breathing

== Science ==
- Fixation (histology) in biochemistry, histology, cell biology and pathology, the technique of preserving a specimen for microscopic study

=== Biology ===
- Carbon fixation, a biochemical process, usually driven by photosynthesis, whereby carbon dioxide is converted into organic compounds
- Nitrogen fixation, a process by which atmospheric nitrogen is incorporated into biomolecules
- Fixation (population genetics), the state when every individual in a population has the same allele at a particular locus
  - Fixation index, a measure of genetic similarity among members of a population

=== Optics ===
- Fixation point, a.k.a. focal point, the point where light rays converge in an optical system

=== Psychology and perceptual sciences ===
- Fixation (psychology), the state in which an individual becomes obsessed with an attachment to another human, an animal, or an inanimate object
- Fixation (visual), maintaining the gaze in a constant direction
- Target fixation, phenomenon where a person's attention is drawn to an object, thereby inadvertently increasing their likelihood of colliding with it

=== Sociology and management science ===
- Metric fixation, a tendency of decision-makers to focus on easily-measured metrics

== Television ==
- "Fixation", a 2020 episode of The Good Doctor (American TV series)

== See also ==
- Fix (disambiguation)
- Oral fixation (disambiguation)
- Soil fixation (disambiguation)
