= Foxx =

Foxx may refer to:

- Foxx (rapper) (born 1984), American rapper
- Foxx (surname)

== See also ==
- Fixx (disambiguation)
- Fox (disambiguation)
