= 9F =

9F or 9-F may refer to:

== Locomotives ==
- BR Standard Class 9F, a class of 2-10-0 steam locomotives
  - BR Standard Class 9F 92020-9
  - BR Standard Class 9F 92220 Evening Star
  - List of preserved BR Standard Class 9F locomotives
- GCR Class 9F, a class of 0-6-2T steam locomotives

== Other uses ==
- 2020 Salvadoran political crisis, commonly referred to as 9F (9 February)
- New York Route 9F, now New York State Route 9G
- Fluorine (_{9}F), a chemical element

== See also ==
- F9 (disambiguation)
- February 9
- 9ff, a German car tuning company
- Grumman F9F Panther, an American carrier-based fighter aircraft
- Grumman F9F Cougar, an American carrier-based fighter aircraft
