= Fixed =

Fixed may refer to:

- Fixed (EP), EP by Nine Inch Nails
- Fixed (film), an animated film directed by Genndy Tartakovsky
- Fixed (typeface), a collection of monospace bitmap fonts that is distributed with the X Window System
- "Fixed" (The Good Wife), a 2009 television episode
- Fixed, subjected to neutering
- Fixed point (mathematics), a point that is mapped to itself by the function
- Fixed line telephone, landline

== See also ==
- Fix (disambiguation)
- Fixer (disambiguation)
- Fixing (disambiguation)
- Fixture (disambiguation)
