= GCR Class 9A =

Class of British 0-6-2T steam locomotives

GCR Classes 9A and 9A Alt. LNER Class N4
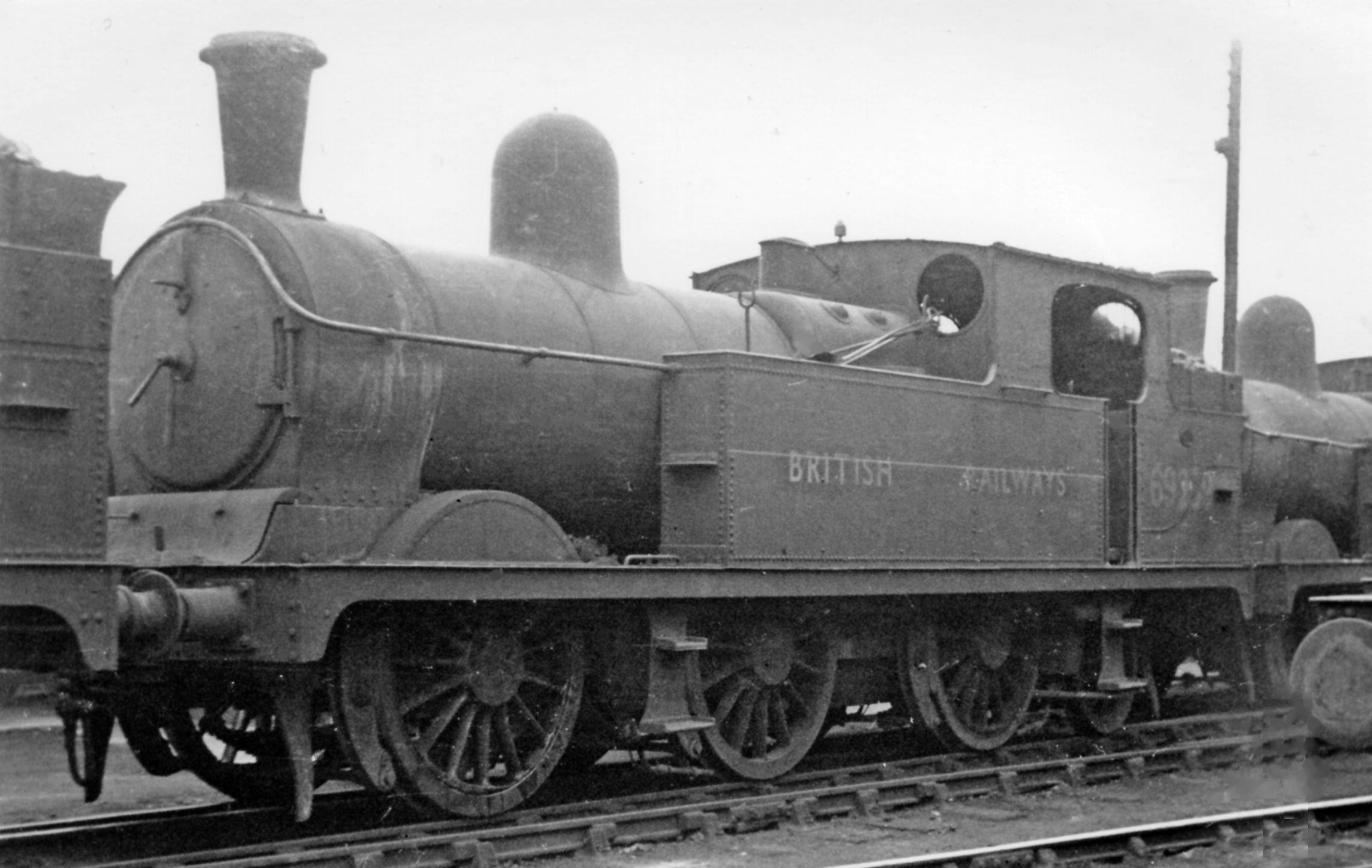
- N4/2 No. 69239 at Barnsley Locomotive Depot 10 April 1949
Type and origin
- Power type: Steam
- Designer: Thomas Parker
- Builder: Gorton Works (6); Neilson & Co. (49)
- Build date: 1889–1892
- Total produced: 55
Specifications
- Configuration
  - Whyte: 0-6-2T
  - UIC: C1 n2t
- Gauge: 4 ft 8 1/2 in (1,435 mm)
- Driver dia.: 5 ft 1 in (1.549 m)
- Trailing dia.: 3 ft 6 in (1.067 m)
- Wheelbase: 22 ft 6 in (6.86 m)
- Length: 9A: 36 ft 2 1/8 in (11.03 m); 9A Alt: 36 ft 8 1/8 in (11.18 m)
- Axle load: 16.75 long tons (17.02 t)
- Adhesive weight: 48.15–48.40 long tons (48.92–49.18 t)
- Loco weight: 61.50–61.95 long tons (62.49–62.94 t)
- Fuel type: Coal
- Fuel capacity: 9A: 2.75 long tons (2.79 t); 9A Alt: 3.00 long tons (3.05 t)
- Water cap.: 9A: 1,300 imp gal (5,910 L; 1,560 US gal); 9A Alt: 1,360 imp gal (6,180 L; 1,630 US gal)
- Firebox
  - Grate area: 18.3 sq ft (1.70 m^{2})
- Boiler: LNER diagram 21
- Boiler pressure: 160 lbf/in^{2} (1.10 MPa)
- Heating surface
  - Firebox: 99 sq ft (9.2 m^{2})
  - Tubes: 964 sq ft (89.6 m^{2})
  - Total surface: 1,063 sq ft (98.8 m^{2})
- Superheater: None
- Cylinders: Two, inside
- Cylinder size: 18 in × 26 in (457 mm × 660 mm)
- Valve gear: Joy
- Valve type: Slide valves
Performance figures
- Tractive effort: 18,780 lbf (83.54 kN)
Career
- Operators: Manchester, Sheffield and Lincolnshire Railway; → Great Central Railway; → London and North Eastern Railway; → British Railways
- Class: GCR: 9A; LNER: N4
- Power class: LNER: 2; BR: 2MT
- Axle load class: LNER/BR: Route availability 4
- Withdrawn: 1932–1954
- Disposition: All scrapped

The Great Central Railway (GCR) Class 9A was a class of 0-6-2T steam locomotive built between 1889 and 1892. From 1923 the locomotives were redesignated Class N4.

== Design and construction ==
Designed by Thomas Parker for the Manchester, Sheffield and Lincolnshire Railway (MS&LR), a total of 55 locomotives were constructed up to 1892. The MS&LR changed its name to the GCR in 1897. In 1892 the final fourteen locomotives were built with a larger coal bunker, increasing their weight to 61.95 long tons (62.94 t). This last batch was classified as Class 9A Altered, sometimes abbreviated as 9A Alt.

The GCR 9A locos were reclassified as N4 under the LNER locomotive numbering and classification system when the GCR was absorbed into the London and North Eastern Railway after the 1923 grouping. The original design were N4/1 and those with extended bunkers N4/2.

In 1925, shorter chimneys began to be fitted to bring the N4s within the LNER composite loading gauge, creating two further variants N4/2 (short bunker) – the existing N4/2s being recoded as N4/3s – and N4/4 (long bunker).

== Locomotive numbering ==
They were built in three batches and numbered 161, 165, 173 (later renumbered 512–514), 601–638, and 712–725. GCR locos had 5000 added to their original numbers when the line was absorbed by the LNER in 1923, resulting in numbers ranging between 5512 and 5725. As part of the LNER's numbering rationalisation scheme introduced in 1946, the surviving 22 N4s were renumbered between 9225 and 9247 with the earliest built receiving the lowest number, and so on. British Railways, formed on 1 January 1948, added 60000 to all LNER loco numbers.
