= The Fix =

The Fix may refer to:

== Music ==
- The Fix (album), a 2002 release by rap artist Scarface
- The Fixx, a New Wave band from London, England, U.K.
- The Fix (band), a hardcore band from Lansing, Michigan
- The Fix, a 2005 EP by Jordan Knight
- The Fix (musical), a 1997 musical by John Dempsey and Dana P. Rowe
- "The Fix" (song), a 2015 single by Nelly
- "The Fix", song by Elbow from The Seldom Seen Kid
- The Fix (opera), a 2019 opera about the Chicago Black Sox Scandal.

== Publications ==
- The Fix (blog), an American political weblog on The Washington Post website
- The Fix (book), a 2012 book about addiction by British writer and Daily Telegraph columnist Damian Thompson
- The Fix, a 2019 novel about cricket match-fixing by Pakistani police officer and crime writer Omar Shahid Hamid

== Film and television ==
- The Art of the Steal (2013 film) or The Fix, a Canadian comedy film
- "The Fix" (Heroes), a 2007 episode of the NBC TV series
- "The Fix" (House), a 2011 TV episode
- "The Fix" (Person of Interest), a 2011 TV episode
- The Fix (1997 film), a British TV film about the 1964 betting scandal in English association football
- The Fix (2008 TV series), a home improvement show on HGTV that began in 2008
- The Fix (2018 TV series), an American Netflix comedy panel show hosted by Jimmy Carr
- The Fix (2019 TV series), an American TV series on ABC
- The Fix (2024 film), South African science fiction film
- The Fix (2026 film), American action film

== See also ==
- Fixx (disambiguation)
- Fix (disambiguation)
- Fixing (disambiguation)
- The Fix Is In (disambiguation)
  - Match fixing
