= GCR Class 9D =

Classes of 124 British locomotives

GCR Class 9 LNER Class J10
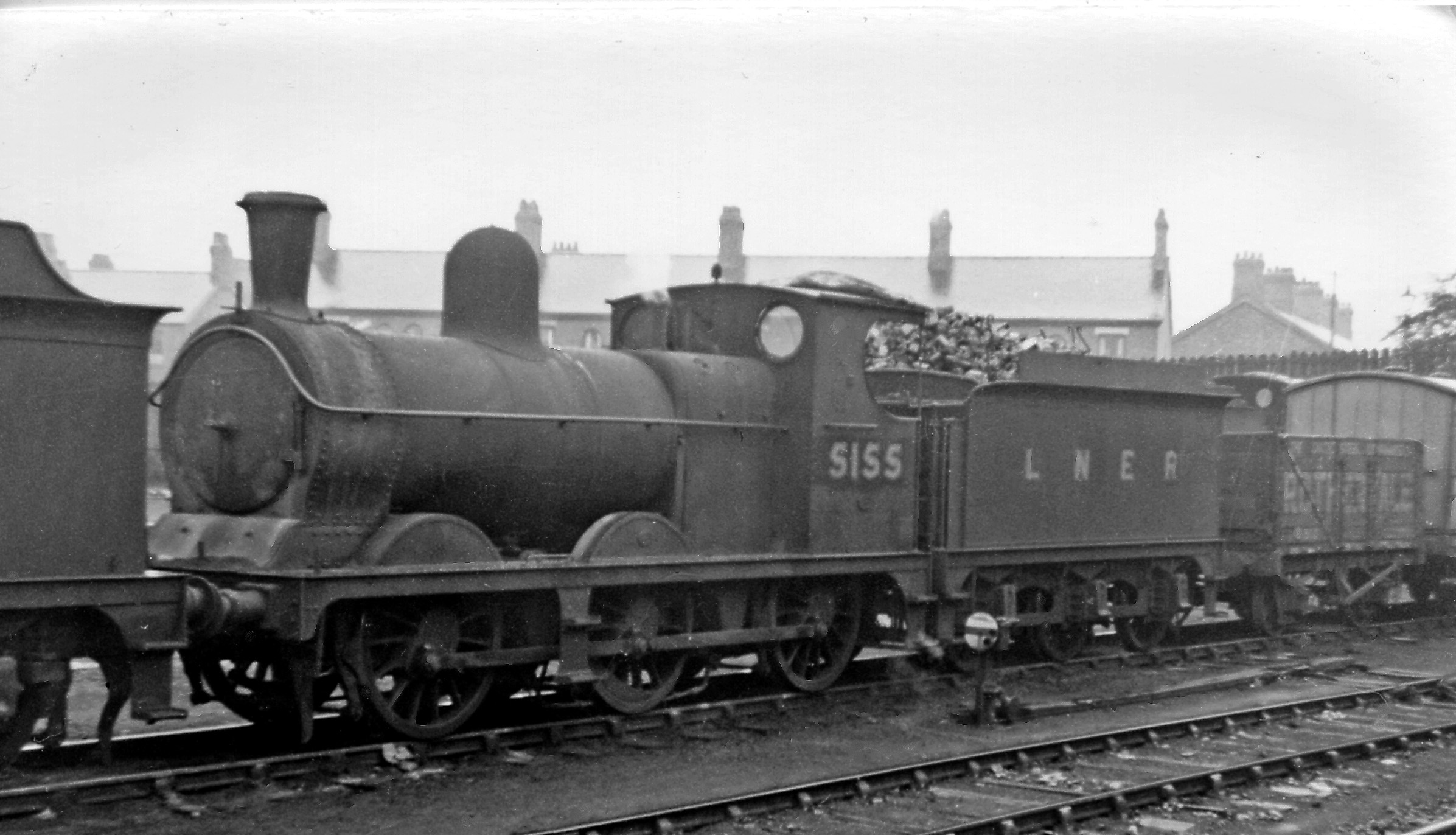
- No. 5155 at Northwich Locomotive Depot 1947
Type and origin
- Power type: Steam
- Designer: Harry Pollitt (engineer)
- Builder: Kitson & Co. (12); Gorton Works (46); Beyer, Peacock & Co. (66)
- Build date: 1892–1902
- Total produced: 124
Specifications
- Configuration
  - Whyte: 0-6-0
  - UIC: C n2t
- Gauge: 4 ft 8 1/2 in (1,435 mm)
- Driver dia.: 5 ft 1 in (1.549 m)
- Length: 51 ft 1 7/8 in (15.59 m)
- Axle load: 15 long tons 10 cwt (34,700 lb or 15.7 t)
- Loco weight: 41 long tons 6 cwt (92,500 lb or 42 t)
- Tender weight: 43 long tons 0 cwt (96,300 lb or 43.7 t)
- Fuel type: Coal
- Fuel capacity: 6 long tons 0 cwt (13,400 lb or 6.1 t)
- Water cap.: 4,000 imp gal (18,000 L; 4,800 US gal)
- Boiler pressure: 160 psi (1.10 MPa)
- Heating surface
  - Firebox: 99 sq ft (9.2 m^{2})
  - Tubes: 964 sq ft (89.6 m^{2})
- Cylinders: Two, inside
- Cylinder size: 18 in × 26 in (457 mm × 660 mm) or 18.5 in × 26 in (470 mm × 660 mm)
- Valve gear: Stephenson
- Valve type: Slide valves
Performance figures
- Tractive effort: 18,780 lbf (83.54 kN)
Career
- Operators: Manchester, Sheffield and Lincolnshire Railway; → Great Central Railway; → London and North Eastern Railway; → British Railways
- Class: GCR: 9; LNER: J10
- Power class: BR: 2F
- Number in class: 124
- Axle load class: LNER/BR: Route Availability: 3
- Withdrawn: 1933–1961
- Disposition: All scrapped

The GCR Classes 9D, 9H and 9M (LNER Class J10) were a class of 124 0-6-0 Steam locomotives designed by Harry Pollitt for freight work on the Manchester, Sheffield and Lincolnshire Railway (MS&LR) later renamed Great Central Railway (GCR).

== Career ==
=== Great Central Railway ===
During World War I, seven of them were loaned to the Caledonian Railway. They were modified to have shorter chimneys. In 1921, 10 were sent to Barrow-in-Furness to undergo repairs.

=== London and North Eastern Railway ===
The locomotives passed to the London and North Eastern Railway (LNER) in 1923. The LNER classified them as J10 with sub-classes J10/1 to J10/6 because of detail differences. Withdrawals began in 1933, but were rather slow.

=== British Railways ===
Some 78 locomotives survived into British Railways (BR) ownership in 1948 as follows:

- J10/2, 4
- J10/4, 38
- J10/6, 36

BR numbers were 65126–65209 (with gaps). In the 1950s, some of them were sent to work at sheds once belonged to the LMS, the L&YR, and the LNWR. They were also reported to be popular with ex-LMS employees. All locomotives had been withdrawn by 1961 with the last one in service No. 65157 going in August 1961. None were preserved.
