= Damian Thompson =

English journalist, editor and author

Damian Thompson (born 1962) is an English journalist, editor and author. He is an associate editor of The Spectator. Previously he worked as editor-in-chief of the Catholic Herald and for The Daily Telegraph where he was religious affairs correspondent and later blogs editor and a Saturday columnist.

== Career ==
Thompson was educated at Presentation College, Reading (later known as the Elvian School), and read history at Mansfield College, Oxford.

In 2003, he received his Ph.D. in the sociology of religion from the London School of Economics for his thesis, The problem of the end: a sociological study of the management of apocalyptic belief at Kensington Temple, a London Pentecostal church, at the end of the millennium. He was religious affairs correspondent of The Daily Telegraph from 1990 to 1994, and subsequently editor-in chief of the Catholic Herald. He was a director of the Herald from 2003 to 2019.

Thompson was a Saturday columnist for The Daily Telegraph from 2011, and the Blogs Editor of the Telegraph Media Group, with responsibility for editing and commissioning blogs on politics, religion, finance and culture. In June 2014, he left his posts at The Telegraph "in entirely amicable circumstances". On 5 August 2014, The Spectator announced that Thompson had been appointed associate editor.

He has written two books about apocalyptic belief and one about conspiracy theories or "counterknowledge", which he describes as "misinformation packaged to look like fact". His book The Fix: How Addiction is Invading our Lives and Taking Over Your World was published in 2012. He writes a monthly column about classical music for The Spectator. He also regularly writes a column on UnHerd.

== Books ==
- The End of Time: Faith and the Fear in the Shadow of the Millennium (University Press of New England, 1997); ISBN 9780874518498
- Loose Canon: A Portrait of Brian Brindley (ed) (Continuum, 2004); ISBN 9780826474186
- Waiting for Antichrist: Charisma and Apocalypse in a Pentecostal Church (Oxford University Press, 2005); ISBN 9780195178562
- Counterknowledge: How We Surrendered to Conspiracy Theories, Quack Medicine, Bogus Science and Fake History (Atlantic Books, 2008); ISBN 9781843546757
- The Fix: How Addiction is Invading our Lives and Taking Over Your World (Collins, 2012); ISBN 9780007436088
