= F9 =

F9, F09, F.IX, F 9 or F-9 may refer to:

== Transport and vehicles ==
- EMD F9, a locomotive in the 1950s
- F-9 Flying Fortress, a variant of the B-17 Flying Fortress
- F9C Sparrowhawk, a biplane parasite fighter from the 1930s
- Falcon 9, a rocket of SpaceX
- Falconar F9A, a Canadian homebuilt aircraft design
- Farrier F-9, a New Zealand trimaran sailboat
- Fokker F.IX, a 1929 Dutch airliner
- Frontier Airlines, IATA code F9, an American low-cost carrier
- Grumman F9F Panther, a United States Navy fighter aircraft
  - Grumman F-9 Cougar, a swept wing version of the F9F Panther
- Italian submarine F9, an Italian Regia Marina (Royal Navy) submarine in commission from 1916 to 1928
- LSWR F9 class, British locomotives of the Southern Railway
- Watsons Bay ferry service, numbered F9, a ferry route in Sydney, Australia

== Other uses ==
- F9 (film), a film in the Fast & Furious franchise
- F 9 Säve, a former Swedish Air Force wing
- F9 (classification), a wheelchair sport classification
- F-9 Park (Fatima Jinnah Park), a public recreational area in Islamabad
- F9 Financial Reporting, a financial reporting software application
- Factor IX, a coagulation factor
- F9, a function key on a computer keyboard
- Zeolite F-9, a sodium-type molecular sieve with faujasite framework structure, also known as 13X

== See also ==
- 9F (disambiguation)
- Fix (disambiguation)
