= William Pollitt =

English railway manager

Colonel Sir William Pollitt VD DL
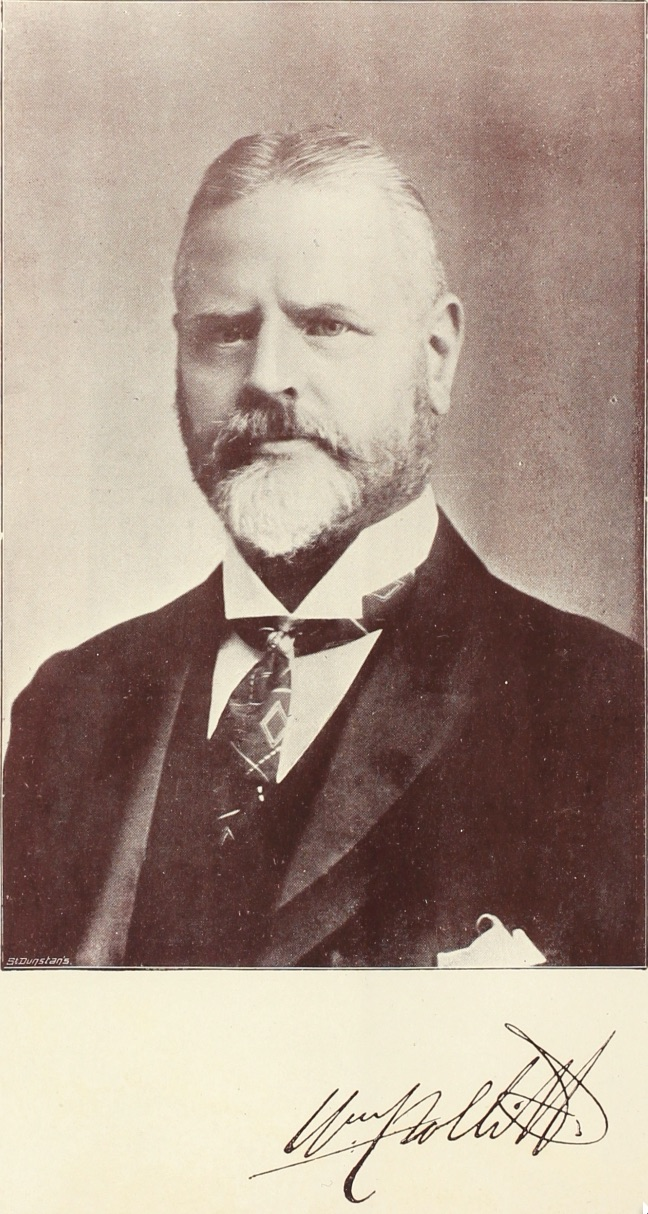
- Pollitt in 1899

High Sheriff of Cheshire
- In office 1908–1908
- Monarch: Edward VII
- Preceded by: Sir Gilbert Greenall
- Succeeded by: Herbert Wheeler Hind

Personal details
- Born: 24 February 1842
- Died: 14 October 1908 (aged 66)

Sir William Pollitt VD DL (24 February 1842 – 14 October 1908) was an English railway manager and civic dignitary. From 1886 to 1902, he served as general manager of the Manchester, Sheffield and Lincolnshire Railway (MSL&R), which was renamed Great Central Railway in 1897. He was knighted in 1899 and appointed High Sheriff of Cheshire in 1908.

== Railway career ==
Pollitt joined the MSL&R in 1857 and had been appointed Accountant for the company in 1869 having previously served as chief clerk to that post. As Accountant he was responsible for an initiative in 1878 to reduce third-class fares to a penny a mile, which increased the net contribution from that class of passengers.

He was appointed to the newly created post of Assistant General Manager in 1885. This post appears to have been created to bolster Underwood, the General Manager, whose health was failing. In turn Pollitt acceded to the General Managership in 1886 when Underwood was elected to the Board.

Among other achievements he piloted the MSL&R's strategic line from Beighton to Annesley via Chesterfield, which came into law in 1889. He was chairman or director of several other railways, and a conservancy Commissioner for rivers Humber and Dee.

Pollitt's disputes with John Bell of the Metropolitan Railway were notorious.

== Knighthood and civic offices ==
Pollitt was knighted in 1899. He was appointed a deputy lieutenant of Cheshire in 1907 and High Sheriff of Cheshire in 1908.

In 1902 the King of the Belgians appointed him an Officer of the Order of Leopold.

== Volunteer Corps ==
Pollitt was appointed Lieutenant Colonel of the British Army's Engineer and Railway Staff Corps on 28 April 1886. He was subsequently promoted to Honorary Colonel and received the Volunteer Officers' Decoration on 8 November 1898. He resigned his commission on 14 May 1902.

== Family ==
William Pollitt was born in Ashton-under-Lyne on 24 February 1842 to William Pollitt (1807 - 1874) and Jane Burton (1808 - 1861) and died on 14 October 1908 at Southport. In 1862 he married Esther Crompton, daughter of Robert Crompton (1812 - 1899) and Mary Walker (1819 - 1848). His son Harry Pollitt (not to be confused with a British Communist party leader of the same name) was a distinguished locomotive engineer who worked for his father's company, the other Harry Pollitt was apprenticed in the same company.

== Portrait ==
A portrait of Sir William Pollitt was painted by William Powell Frith in 1896. The portrait is in the collection of the National Railway Museum.

Business positions
Preceded by Thomas Parker	Locomotive superintendent for Manchester, Sheffield and Lincolnshire Railway; 1893 – 1897	Company reorganized as Great Central Railway
New title Company reorganized from Manchester, Sheffield and Lincolnshire Railway	General Manager of Great Central Railway; 1897 – 1902	Succeeded by Sir William Fay
Honorary titles
Preceded by Sir Gilbert Greenall, Bt	High Sheriff of Cheshire; 1908	Succeeded by Herbert Wheeler Hind
