= Fixture =

A fixture can refer to:

- Fixture (property law)
- Fixture (tool), a tool used in manufacturing
- Light fixture
- Plumbing fixture
- Test fixture, used to control and automate testing
- Virtual fixture
- A type of sporting event

== See also ==
- Fixed (disambiguation)
