= Fixer Upper =

Fixer Upper may refer to:

- Fixer-upper, a real-estate term for a property that is in need of repair
- "Fixer Upper" (Frozen song), a song from the 2013 film Frozen
- ""Fixer Upper" (Dallas Smith song), 2023
- Fixer Upper (TV series), a 2013 TV series aired on HGTV
- "Fixer Upper", an episode of the sitcom The King of Queens
- The Fixer Uppers, a 1935 short film featuring Laurel and Hardy

== See also ==
- Fix-up (disambiguation)
