= Mr. Fix =

Mr. Fix can refer to:

- Fixer (Marvel Comics), a supervillain in Marvel Comics
- Mr. Fix, a character in Around the World in Eighty Days by Jules Verne

== See also ==
- Mr. Fixit (disambiguation)
