= Counterknowledge =

Book by Damian Thompson

- Paperback cover
- Author: Damian Thompson
- Genre: Social sciences
- Publisher: Atlantic Books
- Publication date: 2008
- Publication place: United Kingdom
- Media type: Hardcover and paperback
- Pages: 162
- ISBN: 9781843546757
- OCLC: 443181072
- Followed by: The Fix

Counterknowledge: How We Surrendered to Conspiracy Theories, Quack Medicine, Bogus Science and Fake History is a polemic by British writer and journalist Damian Thompson which examines the dissemination and reception of fringe theories. It was published on 1 January 2008 by Atlantic Books and is Thompson's third book.

== Overview ==
Thompson argues that we are experiencing a "pandemic of credulous thinking". People are increasingly surrendering the values of the Enlightenment to accept a barrage of "counterknowledge", which he defines as "misinformation packaged to look like fact". This concept embodies both theories for which there is no supporting evidence, and theories against which there is already evidence that directly contradicts them. Thompson does not consider religious teachings to be counterknowledge because their claims are metaphysical, and are thus inherently unverifiable.

Among the forms of counterknowledge Thompson examines are alternative medicine, such as homeopathy and crystal therapy; pseudoscience, such as creationism; pseudohistory, such as Holocaust denial; and conspiracy theories, such as those concerning the September 11 attacks and the Moon landing.

== Reception ==
Counterknowledge received a number of positive reviews. In New Humanist magazine, A. C. Grayling described Counterknowledge as an "excellent little book" which debunks sophistry with "great clarity and efficiency". In The Independent, Peter Stanford described it as a "short and punchy book, written with passion and humour"; The Guardian's Jonathan Sale felt that there was not a single "dull sentence". The book was "highly recommended as an initial source for argumentation" and a potential "antidote to the kind of thinking which he [Thompson] critiques" by The Skeptic. In The Daily Telegraph, Tim Lott described the book as "highly enjoyable" and "well-written", but felt that Thompson did not address what he considered to be a critical issue: how to "...promote real knowledge in a world where reality is something that more and more people wish to avoid".

The book drew criticism because of its message in the context of the author's religious association—Thompson is a director of the Catholic Herald. Grayling, an atheist, rejected his justification of how religion isn't counterknowledge and felt that religion should also be considered counterknowledge because it too is "controverted by the evidence of our senses"; Sale also wrote that counterknowledge and religion may be considered indistinguishable. In the Metro, Robert Murphy viewed some of Thompson's conclusions as debatable, but felt that his anger towards those who distribute patently false information was justified.
