= Foxx (surname) =

Foxx is a surname. Notable people with the surname include:

== People ==
- Anthony Foxx (born 1971), American politician
- Dion Foxx (born 1971), American football player
- Inez and Charlie Foxx (1939–1998), American rhythm and blues duo
- Jamie Foxx (born 1967), American actor, singer and comedian; stage name chosen in homage to actor and comedian Redd Foxx.
- Jimmie Foxx (1907–1967), American major league baseball player
- John Foxx (born 1948), English musician
- Kim Foxx (born 1972), State's Attorney for Cook County, Illinois
- Martha Louise Morrow Foxx (1902–1975), American educator from Mississippi
- Redd Foxx (1922–1991), American actor and comedian; stage name chosen (in part) in homage to baseball player Jimmie Foxx.
- Virginia Foxx (born 1943), American politician from North Carolina

== Fictional characters ==
- Mystique (character), a Marvel Comics character who once used the alias Foxx
- Steve and Rod Foxx, a pair of brothers from the Australian television series Double the Fist
- Zachary Foxx, a character from The Adventures of the Galaxy Rangers
- Goldie Foxx, keyboardist of the virtual band Studio Killers

== See also ==
- Fixx § People
