= Fix-up (disambiguation) =

A fix-up is a novel created from short fiction that may or may not have been initially related or previously published.

Fix-up may also refer to:

- Frameup, in British English, providing false evidence in order to falsely prove someone guilty of a crime
- Fixer-upper, a real estate property that will require repair
- "Fixup" a computer science term for an object relocation table
- "Fixing someone up", matchmaking, or arranging a social date for someone

== Entertainment ==
- "The Fix-Up" a 1992 episode of Seinfeld
- Fix Up, a 2004 play by Kwame Kwei-Armah
- "Fix Up", a song by Black Star

== See also ==
- Fixer Upper (disambiguation)
