= Stephen Fix =

American academic

Stephen Eugene Fix was an American academic.

Fix graduated from Boston College in 1974, and completed a master's degree followed by a doctorate, both at Cornell University. He was the Robert G Scott '68 Professor of English at Williams College.

Areas of Expertise

Eighteenth-century British literature, particularly the works of Fielding, Sterne, and Johnson. History of the novel. Elegies as a poetic genre. Twentieth-century American fiction, particularly the works of Nabokov and Pynchon.
