= Soil fixation =

Soil fixation may refer to:

- measures of erosion control
- soil stabilization in landscaping
