= Vertebral fixation =

- Other names: Spinal fixation
- Specialty: Orthopedics, neurology

Vertebral fixation (also known as spinal fixation) is an orthopedic surgical procedure in which two or more vertebrae are anchored to each other through a synthetic vertebral fixation device, with the aim of reducing vertebral mobility and thus avoiding possible damage to the spinal cord and/or spinal roots.

== Indications ==
A vertebral fixation procedure may be indicated in cases of vertebral fracture, vertebral deformity, or degenerative vertebral disorders (such as spondylolisthesis).

== Vertebral fixation devices ==
The device used to achieve vertebral fixation is usually a permanent rigid or semi-rigid prosthesis made of titanium; examples include rods, plates, screws, and various combinations thereof. A less common alternative is the use of a resorbable fixation device, composed of a bio-resorbable material.

The medical community uses several different techniques for stabilizing the posterior region of the spine. The most radical of these techniques is spinal fusion. In recent years/decades spinal surgeons have begun to rely more heavily on mechanical implants, which provide increased stability without so severely limiting the recipient's range of motion. A number of devices have been developed that allow the recipients near natural range of motion while still providing some support. In many cases the support offered by such devices is insufficient, leaving the physician with few other choices than spinal fusion.

A spinal fixation device stabilizes an area of the posterior spine while allowing for a significant range of motion and limiting the compression of the affected vertebrae. The device consists of two or more arm assemblies (lateral) connected by one or more telescopic assemblies (vertical). Each arm assembly is composed of a central portion, which connects to the telescopic assembly or assemblies. Left and right arms attach to the corresponding side of the central portion of the arm assembly. Each arm section is directly connected to its individual pedicle by means of pedicle fasteners.

More information about this specific spinal fixation device can be found in the United States Patent Service's November 13, 2007 publication of new patents.

== See also ==
- Vertebral fusion
