= Harry Pollitt (engineer) =

English engineer (1865–1945)

- Born: 26 December 1865; Ashton under Lyne, Lancashire, England
- Died: 23 January 1945 (aged 79); Bournemouth, England
- Parent: William Pollitt
- Engineering career
- Discipline: Steam locomotive engineer
- Employer(s): Manchester, Sheffield and Lincolnshire Railway; Great Central Railway

Harry Pollitt (26 December 1865 – 23 January 1945) was an English railway engineer, who was Locomotive Engineer of the Manchester, Sheffield and Lincolnshire Railway from 1894 to 1897 and its successor, the Great Central Railway, from 1897 to 1900.

== Biography ==
He was born on 26 December 1865 in Ashton-under-Lyne, Lancashire. His father was Sir William Pollitt, who became general manager of the Manchester, Sheffield and Lincolnshire Railway (MSLR) between 1866 and 1899.

Harry Pollitt was appointed Locomotive Engineer of the MSLR from January 1894, replacing Thomas Parker, who resigned at the end of 1893. Pollitt had previously been Works Manager at the Gorton locomotive works of the MSLR, under Parker. In June 1894, his duties were expanded to cover the MSLR's fleet of ferries on the Humber, and his job title was changed to Locomotive & Marine Engineer. On 1 August 1897, the MSLR was renamed the Great Central Railway (GCR).

Pollitt personally saw off the first GCR passenger service from Marylebone on 15 March 1899.

He resigned in June 1900, and married an Australian woman (Mabel Amanda Alves 1877-1944) the following year. He never worked again, his right to deploy the title Major (see his wife's will) in later life stems from his father's role in the 4th Battalion of The Manchester Regiment, a volunteer territorial regiment in which Harry never saw active service. He was succeeded as Locomotive and Marine Engineer by John G. Robinson.

== Notes ==
Business positions
Preceded by Thomas Parker as Locomotive, Carriage and Wagon Superintendent	Locomotive Engineer of the Manchester, Sheffield and Lincolnshire Railway; 1894	Post renamed Locomotive & Marine Engineer
New title Post renamed	Locomotive & Marine Engineer of the Manchester, Sheffield and Lincolnshire Railway; 1894–1897	Employer renamed Great Central Railway
New title Employer renamed	Locomotive & Marine Engineer of the Great Central Railway; 1897–1900	Succeeded by John G. Robinson
