= The Fix (book) =

Book by Damian Thompson

- First edition
- Author: Damian Thompson
- Genre: Social sciences
- Publisher: Collins
- Publication date: 24 May 2012 (UK) (hardcover); 13 Jan 2013 (UK) (paperback)
- Publication place: United Kingdom
- Pages: 352
- ISBN: 9780007436088
- Preceded by: Counterknowledge

The Fix: How Addiction Is Invading our Lives and Taking Over Your World is a non-fiction book by the British writer and journalist Damian Thompson in which Thompson examines addiction and how it is being harboured in society. His fourth book, it was published in May 2012 by Collins. Shortly after release, its core contention that addiction is not a pathological disorder provoked critical responses from journalists.

== Overview ==
In addition to his research, the book is informed by Thompson's experience as a former alcoholic and his participation in the Alcoholics Anonymous Twelve-Step sobriety program. He rejects the brain disease theory of addiction (an example of which is disease theory of alcoholism), arguing that addiction is instead a voluntary and reversible behavioural disorder based on the brain's reward system, namely the mesolimbic pathway. Thompson argues that addiction is universally being fostered by technology and the social environment for commercial purposes, pointing to sugar addiction from sugar-rich foods such as cupcakes, addictions to pornography, video games, shopping, and drugs such as alcohol, caffeine; illegal drugs such as cocaine and heroin, and controlled medical drugs — such as zopiclone — obtained via prescription or without one from an online pharmacy.

He believes that the boundaries between everyday addictions and less socially acceptable ones are becoming increasingly blurred, and also perceives an overlap between them, citing evidence that sugar triggers "the brain's natural opioids," and that the brain can become addicted to them in the same way that it does to morphine or heroin.

== Reception ==
The Economist described the book as an "entertaining and informative account" of addiction, although written in a "waspish" style which it considered to understate the seriousness of the issue. ConservativeHome viewed it as an "eye-opening, iconoclastic analysis" of contemporary addiction. In Wired UK, Milo Yiannopoulos felt its perception of a disparity between the evolutionary status quo of human beings and the overwhelming world in which they live was presented with "gentle but terrifyingly persuasive regularity".

The book provoked a dispute between Thompson and The Guardian's Tanya Gold, a recovering alcoholic. Gold described it as a "dangerous polemic", accusing Thompson of writing a "poison pen letter" to Alcoholics Anonymous. The Huffington Post's Rupert Wolfe-Murray also criticised Thompson's rejection of the disease model of addiction, suggesting he was giving alcoholism the banality of everyday obsessions and asking if this was a form of denial.

Thompson responded to Gold, clarifying his view that addiction is a matter of choice, and also responded to Wolfe-Murray on his blog, writing that the disease model of addiction should not be an "emotional crutch".

In The Washington Post, James Norton wrote that Thompson speaks in a deceptively casual voice at first, but ultimately brings the reader through a "whirlwind of anecdotes, interviews and studies", offering an argument with "real force and substance" and engaging reading material. He felt that Thompson's argument isn't likely to be popular, but is a "far more nuanced look at the mechanics of addiction than we lay readers are usually offered".
