= Théodore Fix =

Swiss-born French economist

Théodore Fix (1800, Solothurn - 31 July 1846, Paris) was a Swiss-born French economist.

== Biography ==
Fix went to Paris in 1830, where he edited the geographic section and contributed most of the geographic articles for the Bulletin universel des sciences. In 1833 he founded and edited the Revue mensuelle d'économie politique (1833–1836, 5 volumes) and wrote a large number of noteworthy articles for the Journal des l'Économistes and other French newspapers. In 1840, the Académie des Sciences Morales et Politiques awarded a prize to his treatise L'Association des douanes allemandes on the Zollverein and commissioned him to elaborate the economic part of the Rapport sur les progrès des sciences sociales depuis 1789. Keenly aware of the situation of the working classes, Fix demanded better educational opportunities for the masses, measures in favor of the health of the factory workers, and workers' rights. His last work, Observations sur l'état des classes ouvrières (Paris, 1846), argued that the working classes deserved better opportunities.

== Selected publications ==
- Théodore Fix (1833). Revue mensuelle d'économie politique (in French). Vol. 1-3 (1833-1834). Paris. pp. 5 v.
- Théodore Fix (1833). Revue mensuelle d'économie politique (in French). Vol. 4-5 (1835-1836). Paris. pp. 5 v.
- Théodore Fix (1846). Observations sur l'état des classes ouvrières (in French). Paris: Guillaumin.

== Sources ==
- "Fix, Theodore". Meyers Konversationslexikon (Online). Vol. 6 (4th ed.). p. 320; retrobID = 105762 (in German)
- "Fix. 1. Théodore F.". Nordisk familjebok. Vol. 8 (2nd ed.). 1908. p. 473. (in Swedish)
