= Mr. Fixit =

Mr. Fixit may refer to:

- Mr. Fixit (TV series), a 1955-1965 Canadian television series
- Mr. Fix-It, a 1918 silent film starring Douglas Fairbanks
- "Mr. Fix It", a song by the English reggae band UB40 on their album Labour of Love III.
- Mr. Fix It (2006 film), a comedy film starring David Boreanaz
- "Mr. Fix It", an episode of Yes, Dear
- Mr. Fixit, a character in Richard Scarry's Busytown
- Mr. Fixit, a robot in Cubix: Robots for Everyone

== See also ==
- Joe Fixit, an alias of the Hulk in Marvel comics
