= GCR Class 9F =

British steam locomotive

GCR Classes 9C, 9F & 9O LNER Class N5
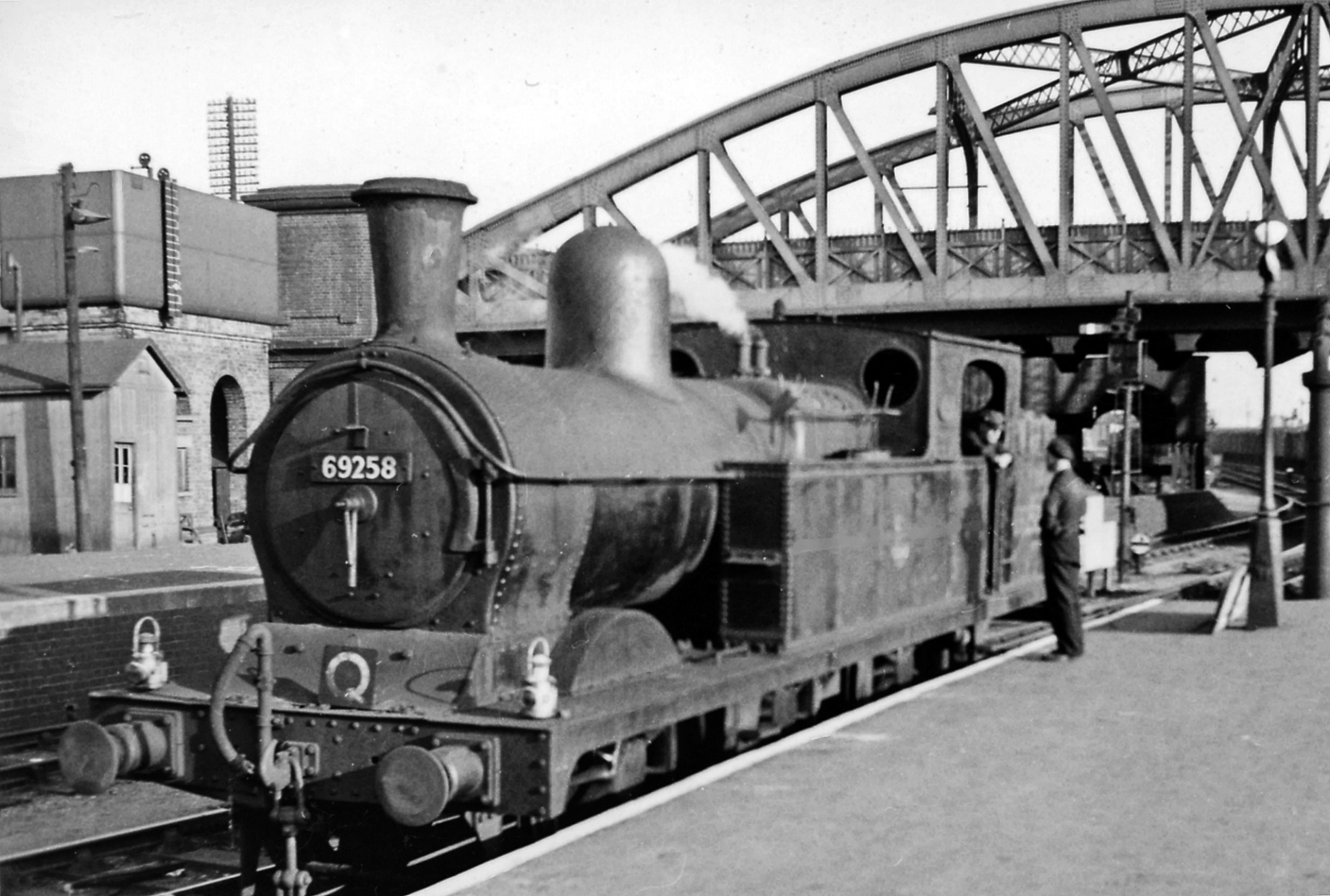
- N5/2 0-6-2T No. 69258 at Peterborough North, 16 August 1958
Type and origin
- Power type: Steam
- Designer: Thomas Parker
- Builder: Gorton Works (50); Beyer, Peacock & Co. (81)
- Build date: 1891–1901
- Total produced: 131
- Rebuild date: 1915 (one only as class 9O)
Specifications
- Configuration
  - Whyte: 0-6-2T
  - UIC: C1 n2t
- Gauge: 4 ft 8 1/2 in (1,435 mm) standard gauge
- Driver dia.: 5 ft 1 in (1.549 m)
- Trailing dia.: 3 ft 6 in (1.067 m)
- Wheelbase: 22 ft 6 in (6.86 m)
- Length: 38 ft 8 1/8 in (11.79 m) over buffers
- Axle load: 9C/9F: 17.00 long tons (17.27 t; 19.04 short tons); 9O: 18.50 long tons (18.80 t; 20.72 short tons)
- Adhesive weight: 48.98–54.25 long tons (49.77–55.12 t; 54.86–60.76 short tons)
- Loco weight: 62.70–66 long tons (63.71–67.06 t; 70.22–73.92 short tons)
- Fuel type: Coal
- Fuel capacity: 9C/9F: 3.00 long tons (3.05 t; 3.36 short tons); 9O: 3.80 long tons (3.86 t; 4.26 short tons)
- Water cap.: 9C/9F: 1,360 imp gal (6,200 L; 1,630 US gal); 9O: 1,840 imp gal (8,400 L; 2,210 US gal)
- Firebox
  - Grate area: 18.3 sq ft (1.70 m^{2})
- Boiler: LNER diagram 21
- Boiler pressure: 160 lbf/in^{2} (1.10 MPa)
- Heating surface
  - Firebox: 99 sq ft (9.2 m^{2})
- Cylinders: Two, inside
- Cylinder size: 18 in × 26 in (457 mm × 660 mm)
- Valve gear: Stephenson
- Valve type: Slide valves
Performance figures
- Tractive effort: 9C/9F: 18,780 lbf (83.54 kN); 9O: 19,840 lbf (88.25 kN)
Career
- Operators: Manchester, Sheffield and Lincolnshire Railway; → Great Central Railway; → London and North Eastern Railway; → British Railways
- Class: GCR: 9F; LNER: N5
- Power class: LNER: 2; BR: 2MT
- Axle load class: LNER/BR: Route availability 4
- Withdrawn: 1936–1961
- Disposition: All scrapped

The Great Central Railway (GCR) Class 9F was a class of 0-6-2T steam locomotive built between 1891 and 1901. From 1923 the locomotives were redesignated Class N5.

== Design and construction ==
Designed by Thomas Parker for the Manchester, Sheffield and Lincolnshire Railway (MS&LR), the prototype 9F was built in 1891. A total of 12 batches were constructed up to 1901, with 131 locos being completed. The MS&LR changed its name to the GCR in 1897. The GCR 9F locos were reclassified as N5 under the LNER locomotive numbering and classification system when the GCR was absorbed into the London & North Eastern Railway after the 1923 grouping. It was the first design for a British railway to use the Belpaire firebox.

== Operation and use ==
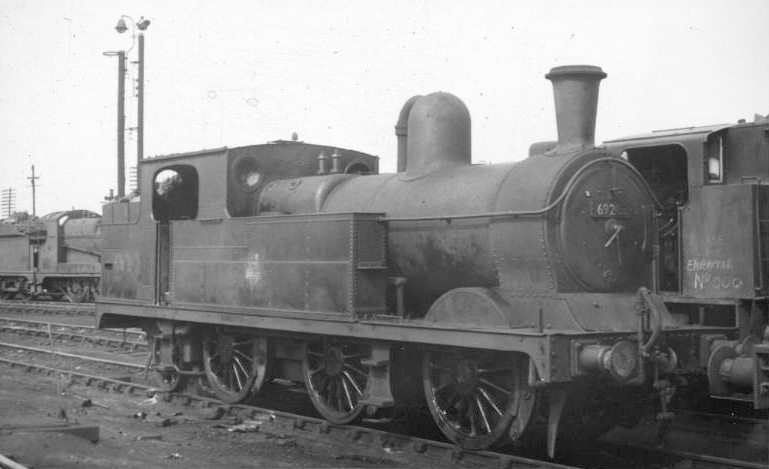
Parker GCR 9F (later N5) 0-6-2T loco 69263, built in 1892, at Langwith Junction engine shed on 7 August 1960. This was one of the last N5 locos to remain operational.

The 9F, later N5, locos were utilised for a variety of purposes including goods shunting, short goods train trips and local passenger train duties. Some locos acted as station pilots at larger termini.

The N5 class was widely spread over the ex-GCR rail system and elsewhere. During July 1952, there were N5s based at Neasden (London), Immingham, Lincoln, Darnall (Sheffield), Gorton (Manchester), and Northwich, Chester and Wrexham, plus several other loco depots.

== Locomotive numbering ==
The GCR locos had 5000 added to their original numbers when the line was absorbed by the LNER in 1923, resulting in numbers ranging between 5021 and 5946. As part of the LNER's numbering rationalisation scheme introduced in 1946, the surviving 121 N5s were renumbered between 9250 and 9370 with the earliest built receiving the lowest number, and so on. British Railways, formed on 1 January 1948, added 60000 to all LNER loco numbers.

== Withdrawal and scrapping ==
All 131 9F locos survived to be absorbed by the LNER in 1923. 121 N5 locos remained in service at the creation of British Railways in 1948. 117 survived on 24 April 1954, reducing to 46 on 8 March 1958 as diesel-electric shunters were delivered. The last N5 was withdrawn for scrapping in 1961.
