= Oral fixation =

Oral fixation may refer to:

In psychology:

- Oral stage, a term used by Sigmund Freud to describe the child's development during the first 18 months of life, in which an infant's pleasure centers are in the mouth.

In music:

- Oral Fixation, an album by Lydia Lunch.
- Fijación Oral, Vol. 1, the sixth studio album by Shakira
- Oral Fixation, Vol. 2, the seventh studio album by Shakira
- Oral Fixation Volumes 1 & 2, a box set by Shakira
- Oral Fixation Tour (album), the third live album by Shakira
- Oral Fixation Tour, a 2006–07 world tour by Shakira
- "Oral Fixation", a song by Scene Queen from the 2024 album Hot Singles in Your Area
