= The Fix Is In =

The Fix Is In may refer to:

- "The Fix is In", a song by Heatmiser from their 1996 album Mic City Sons
- "The Fix Is In", a song by OK Go from their 2002 album OK Go
- "The Fix", a song by Elbow from their 2009 album The Seldom Seen Kid

== See also ==
- The Fix (disambiguation)
- Fix (disambiguation)
- Match fixing
