= Fixx =

Fixx may refer to:

== Arts and entertainment ==
- Fixx (Marvel comics)
- The Fixx, English New Wave band

== People ==
- Calvin Fixx (1906–1950), American journalist and editor, father of Jim Fixx
- Jim Fixx (1932–1984), American author, popularizer of the sport of running
- Tori Fixx (fl. 1990s–?), one of the first openly gay hip hop artists

== See also ==
- Fix (disambiguation)
- The Fix (disambiguation)
- Foxx (disambiguation)
- Phixx, a similarly titled British pop group
