= Fixer =

Fixer or The Fixer may refer to:

== In print ==
- Fixer (Marvel Comics), two different Marvel Comics characters
- The Fixer, a superhero and protagonist of Frank Miller's Holy Terror (graphic novel)
- The Fixer (comics), a journalistic comic on the Bosnian War by Joe Sacco
- The Fixer (novel), a 1966 novel by Bernard Malamud

== Film and TV ==
- The Fixer (1915 film), a silent film starring Alma Hanlon
- The Fixer (1968 film), a British film based on the Malamud novel
- The Fixer (1998 film), an American TV film by screenwriter Charles Robert Carner
- Fixer: The Taking of Ajmal Naqshbandi, a 2009 documentary
- The Fixer (2016 film), a drama
- The Fixer, also known as Burn Country, a 2016 drama film
- The Fixer (2008 TV series), a British television drama
- The Fixer (2015 Canadian TV series), a Canadian miniseries
- The Fixer (2015 Hong Kong TV series), a Hong Kong television drama
- Fixer, a 2023 Japanese television series starring Toshiaki Karasawa
- The Fixer (2025 American TV series), a reality series
- "Fixer" (Justified), a 2010 episode of Justified
- "The Fixer", an episode of the British sitcom Black Books
- The Fixer, local South African title for the American TV series Scandal
- Alex Polizzi: The Fixer, British business documentary show
- "The Fixer", Frank Tagliano, protagonist of the TV series Lilyhammer
- Fixer, RC-1140, clone trooper of Delta Squad in the Star Wars movies
- Fixer (TV series), a British-Lebanese action comedy television series

== Music ==
- Fixers (band), experimental/psychedelic pop English band
- Fixer (Download album), 2007
- Fixer (Akina Nakamori album), 2015
- "The Fixer", song from Smokin' (Humble Pie album), released in 1972
- "Fixxxer", a song from Reload (Metallica album), released 1997
- "The Fixer", song by George Thorogood from 2003 album Ride 'Til I Die
- "The Fixer" (song), 2009 single by Pearl Jam from Backspacer

== Other uses ==
- Fixer (person), a person who solves problems or fixes things, sometimes in an illicit matter
- Photographic fixer, a chemical that stabilizes developed photographs
- Fixer, Kentucky, United States, an unincorporated community
- Fixer, a character class in Cyberpunk 2020, a role-playing game

== See also ==
- Mentallo and the Fixer, American electro-industrial band
