= Thomas Parker (engineer) =

Thomas Parker (11 July 1829 – 25 November 1903) was Locomotive, Carriage and Wagon Superintendent of the Manchester, Sheffield and Lincolnshire Railway from 1886–1893. He introduced a new type of locomotive in Britain, which used a Belpaire firebox.

== Life ==
Parker was born in Ayrshire on 11 July 1829, and began his career as an apprentice at the Greenock works of the Caledonian Railway in 1847.

In 1858 he moved away from Scotland. At the Manchester, Sheffield and Lincolnshire Railway he was Carriage and Wagon Superintendent at the railway's Gorton works. He was one of the first to construct 6-wheeled bogie coaches, and in 1885 he produced one of the first dining car designs in Britain.

In 1886, he replaced Charles Reboul Sacre as locomotive, wagon and carriage superintendent.

In 1891 he introduced the first locomotive on a British railway to use a Belpaire firebox, which had been used on export locomotives built by the local manufacturer Beyer Peacock since 1872. The continuous vacuum brake and internal communication cord were introduced by the railway, gaining Board of Trade approval in 1893.

Parker retired in 1893 and was succeeded by Harry Pollitt. He died in Gorton on 25 November 1903.

== Sources ==
- LNER Encyclopedia (see below)

Business positions
Preceded by Charles Sacré	Locomotive, Carriage and Wagon Superintendent of the Manchester, Sheffield and Lincolnshire Railway; 1886-1893	Succeeded by Harry Pollitt
