= Winslow Road railway station =

Former Metropolitan Railway Station in Buckinghamshire

Winslow Road
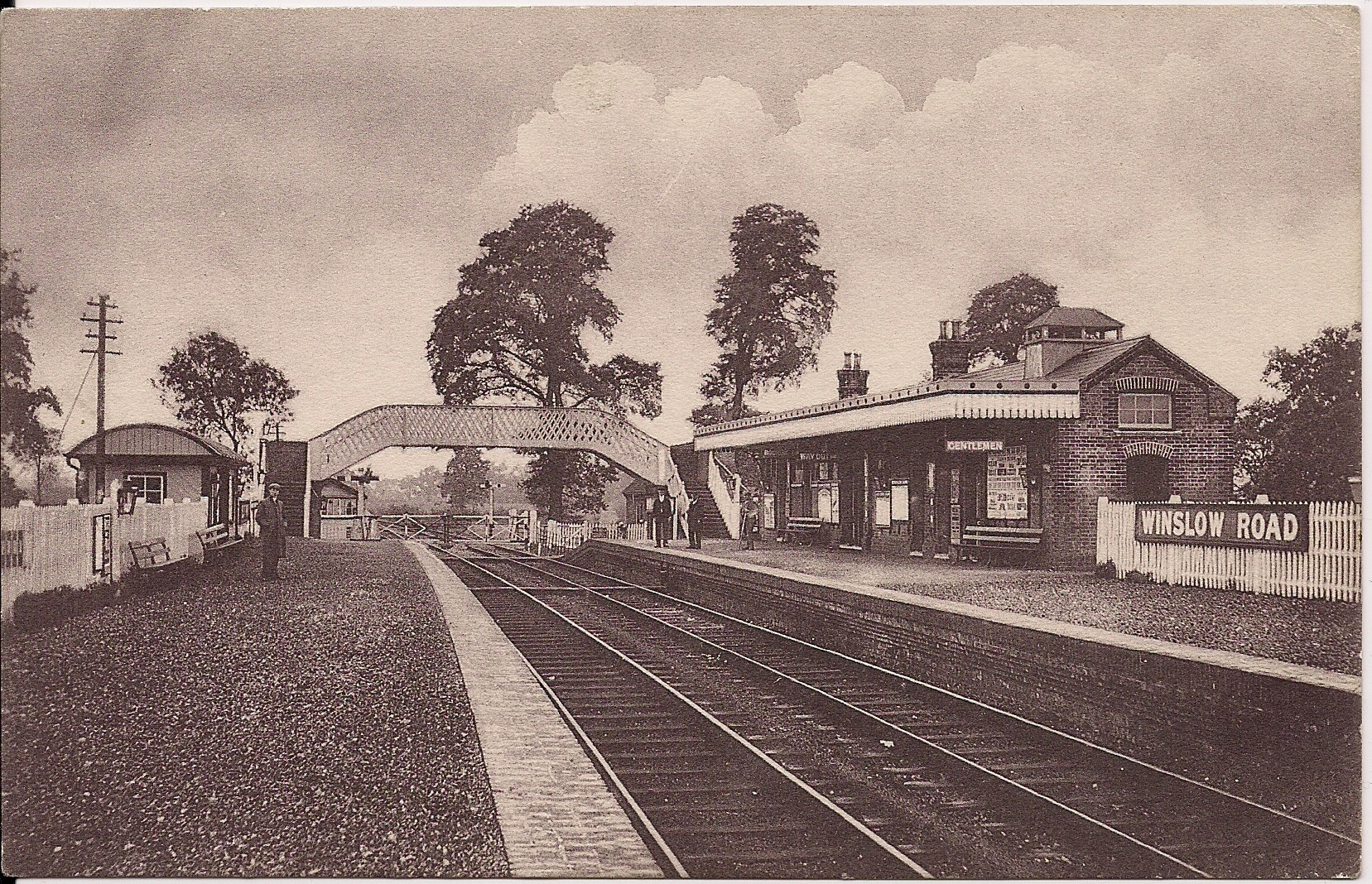
- Interactive map of Winslow Road

General information
- Location: East Claydon
- Local authority: Buckinghamshire
- Grid reference: SP750260
- Number of platforms: 2

Railway companies
- Original company: Aylesbury and Buckingham Railway
- Pre-grouping: Metropolitan Railway; Metropolitan and Great Central Joint Railway

Key dates
- 1868: Opened
- 1936: Closed to local passengers and goods
- 1947: Line closed
- Replaced by: none

Other information
- Coordinates: 51.9277°N 0.9104°W

Winslow Road railway station served the village of East Claydon near Winslow to the north of Quainton in Buckinghamshire, England. It was the second station to serve the town after Winslow on the Varsity Line.

== History ==
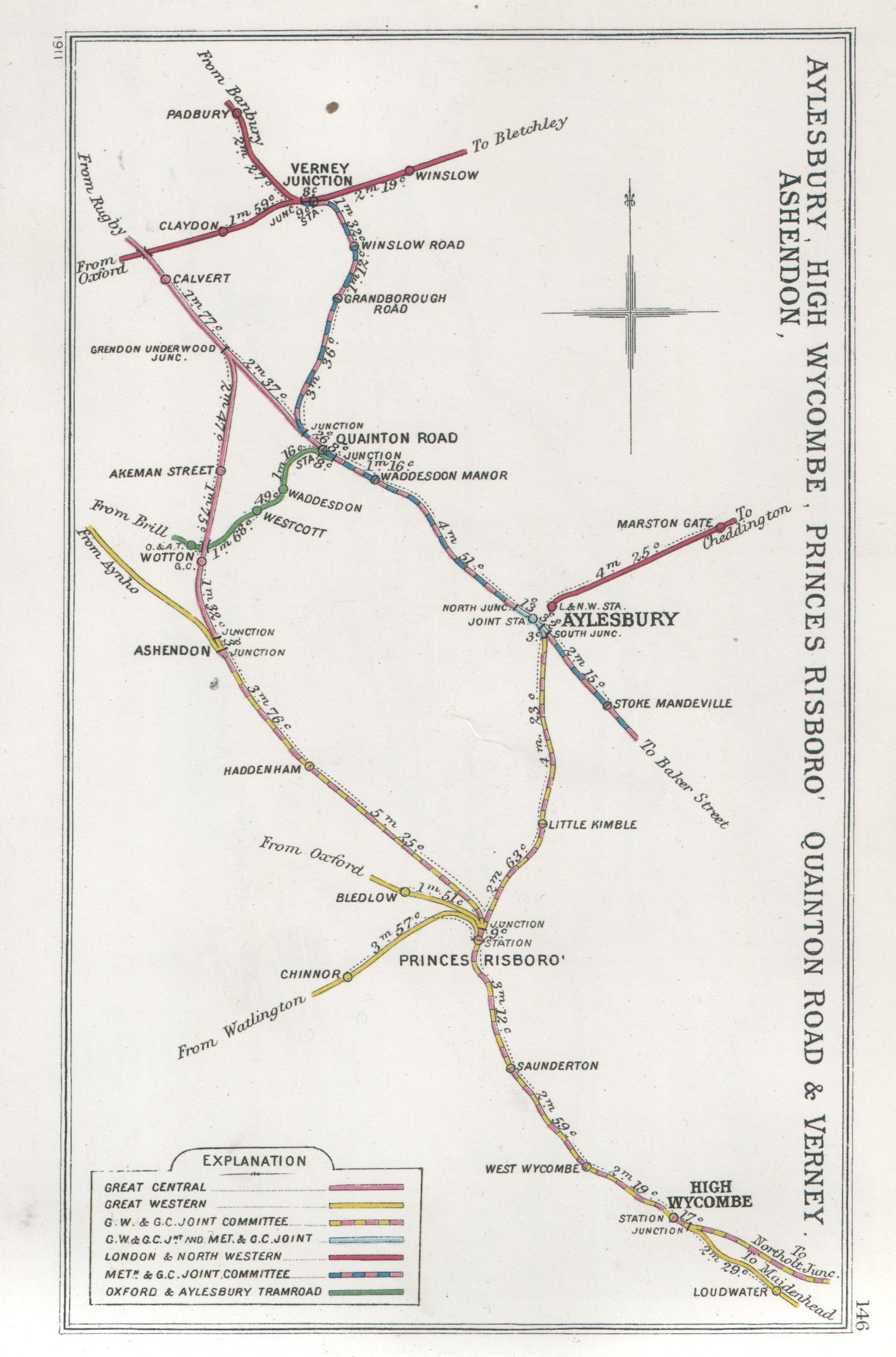
A 1911 Railway Clearing House map of railways in the vicinity of Winslow.

The station was opened by the Aylesbury and Buckingham Railway (A&BR) on 23 September 1868 as part of its 12 3/4-mile (20.5-kilometre) route from Aylesbury to Verney Junction where it joined the Buckinghamshire Railway's Oxford to Bletchley line. The line was single track and worked from the start by the Great Western Railway, which provided a service of three trains each way daily. The A&BR, which had for some time been in a parlous financial state, was absorbed by the Metropolitan Railway with effect from 1 July 1891. From 2 April 1906, all Metropolitan services north of Harrow South Junction to Verney Junction were run by the Metropolitan and Great Central Joint Railway; this continued until 6 July 1936 when the London Passenger Transport Board, which had taken over the Metropolitan in 1933, withdrew local passenger services as an economy measure. Through services ceased entirely on 7 September 1947 and the route closed.

The original A&BR station, which was situated to the north of a level crossing over the East Claydon Road, had a single platform and lightweight flange-bolted flat-bottom rail. A small hut and cottage were provided for the gatekeeper who also served as the station's porter; a small signal box controlled access to a siding. The station was entirely rebuilt by the Metropolitan Railway which doubled the line and provided a Down platform which partially obstructed the line of sight from the signal box.

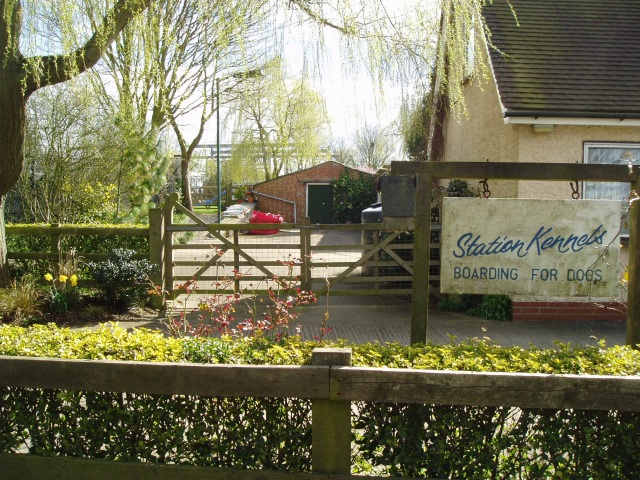
Station site in March 2005.

Winslow Road saw little passenger traffic, which may be attributed to its location a little over 1 mile (1.6 km) from the village of Winslow which it purported to serve and which had its own conveniently sited station on the Oxford to Bletchley line since May 1850. During 1939, work started on singling the line south of Winslow Road, with the double track left on a section from a pair of stops near the station to Verney Junction. The work was completed by 28 January 1940 and the line south of Winslow Road became effectively a long siding. Train crews operated the level crossing gates and all signalling was removed to make the route one section between two junctions. Freight traffic from the Oxford to Bletchley line was rerouted via a connecting spur near Calvert which was brought into use on 14 September 1940, thereby allowing trains to work south over the Great Central Main Line.

After closure, the track was eventually lifted although the northern section of the route between Verney Junction and Winslow Road was retained until 1957 for the storage of condemned rolling stock, with the track finally being removed in 1961.

Preceding station	Disused railways	Following station
Verney Junction; Line and station closed	Metropolitan Railway; Verney Junction Branch	Granborough Road; Line and station closed

== Present day ==
The site of Winslow Road has been reused for dog kennels. A brick pig sty was constructed between the platforms and this now forms part of the kennels. A fragment of the Up platform complete with blue bricks survives to the left of the former pig sty.

Due to its association with the Metropolitan line, this station is considered to be one of the Closed London Underground stations although it is over 40 miles (64 kilometres) from London and is not underground.
