= Granborough Road railway station =

Former railway station in England

Granborough Road
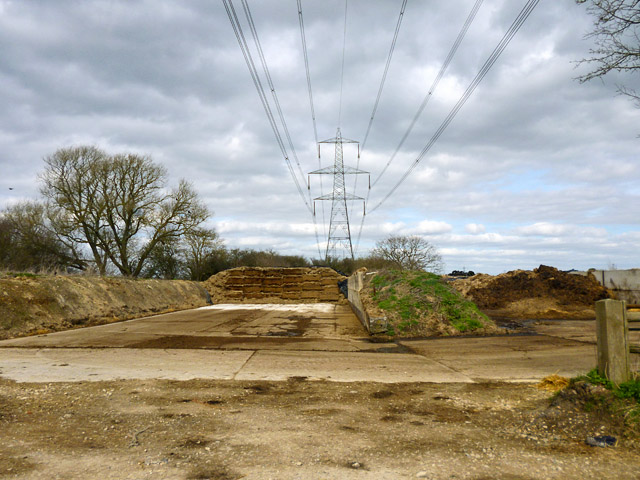
- Station site in 2015
- Interactive map of Granborough Road

General information
- Location: Granborough
- Local authority: Buckinghamshire
- Grid reference: SP745242
- Number of platforms: 2

Railway companies
- Original company: Aylesbury and Buckingham Railway
- Pre-grouping: Metropolitan and Great Central Joint Railway
- Post-grouping: Metropolitan and Great Central Joint Railway

Key dates
- 23 September 1868: Opened as Grandborough Road
- 6 October 1920: Renamed Granborough Road
- 6 July 1936: Station closed

Other information
- Coordinates: 51.9116°N 0.9176°W

Granborough Road railway station (initially Grandborough Road) was a station serving the village of Granborough, to the north of Quainton in Buckinghamshire, England.

== History ==
The station was opened by the Aylesbury and Buckingham Railway (A&BR) on 23 September 1868 as part of its 12.75-mile (20.52-kilometre) route from Aylesbury to Verney Junction where it joined the Buckinghamshire Railway's Oxford to Bletchley line. The line was single track and worked from the start by the Great Western Railway, which provided a service of three trains each way daily. The A&BR, which had for some time been in a parlous financial state, was absorbed by the Metropolitan Railway with effect from 1 July 1891. From 2 April 1906, all Metropolitan services north of Harrow South Junction to Verney Junction were run by the Metropolitan and Great Central Joint Railway; this continued until 6 July 1936 when the London Passenger Transport Board, which had taken over the Metropolitan in 1933, withdrew local passenger services as an economy measure. Through services ceased entirely on 7 September 1947 and the route closed.

Whilst open, this station was accessed via a branch line off the former Great Central Main Line with the junction being just to the north of Quainton Road. The branch line continued through Winslow Road and ended at a terminating platform at Verney Junction.

Today very little remains of this station, the permanent way between Quainton Road and Verney Junction having long ago been lifted. The site is now a farmer's field and although a bit of platform does remain, the track bed itself is now a route for pylons.

Despite being over 30 miles from London and not underground, the association with the Metropolitan line means this station is considered to be one of the closed London Underground stations. It is briefly referred to as such in the 2012 James Bond film Skyfall when Bond spots the name embedded in a cypher.

== Routes ==
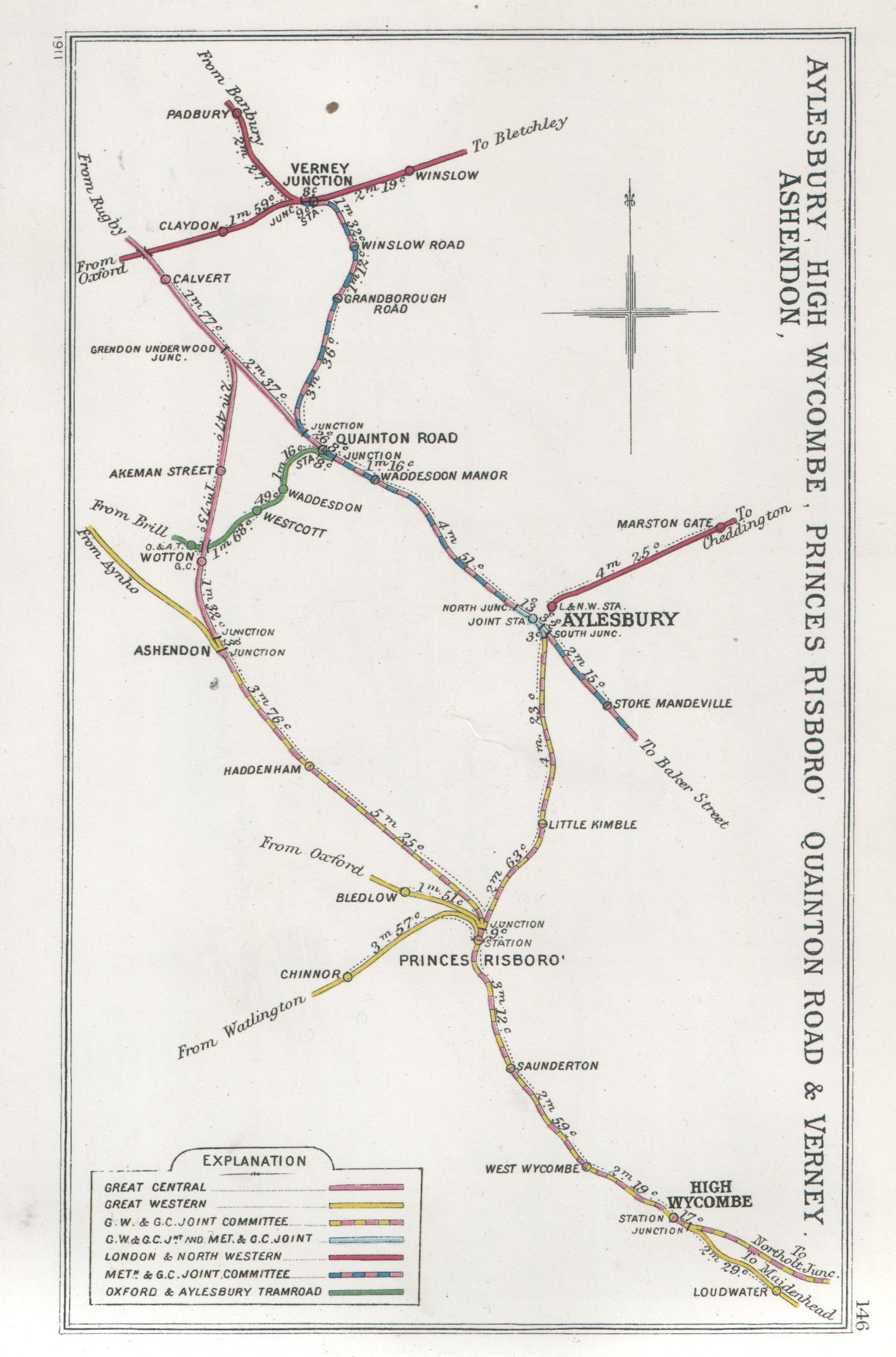
A 1911 Railway Clearing House Junction Diagram showing railways in the vicinity of Granborough Road (upper left; shown as Grandborough Road)

Preceding station	Disused railways	Following station
Winslow Road	Metropolitan Railway; Verney Junction Branch	Quainton Road
