= Metropolitan Railway D Class =

Class of British 2-4-0T steam locomotives

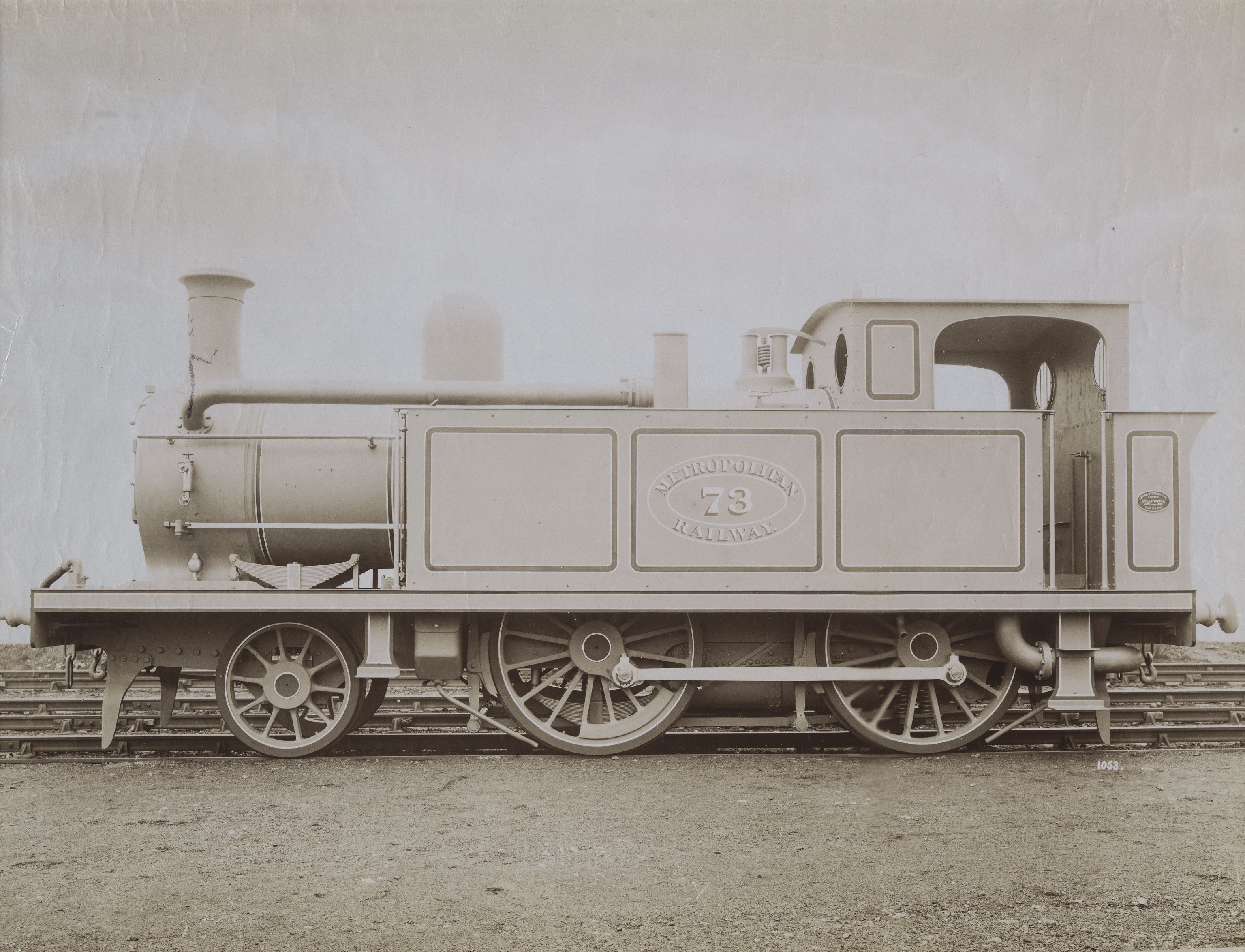
Type and origin
- Power type: Steam
- Builder: Sharp, Stewart and Company
- Serial number: 4055–4056, 4075–4078
- Build date: 1895
- Total produced: 6
Specifications
- Configuration
  - Whyte: 2-4-0T
  - UIC: 1′B n2t
- Gauge: 4 ft 8 1/2 in (1,435 mm)
- Fuel type: Coal
Career
- Operators: Metropolitan Railway
- Numbers: 71–76
- Withdrawn: 1920-1923
- Disposition: All scrapped

The Metropolitan Railway D Class was a group of six 2-4-0T locomotives built for the Metropolitan Railway in 1894-1895 by Sharp, Stewart and Company.

== Overview ==
Two locomotives were used on the Verney Junction-Aylesbury section. The other four ran between Aylesbury and Baker Street and were fitted with condensing apparatus, but this was later removed.

== Withdrawal ==
The class was withdrawn starting in 1920. Some were sold, while others were scrapped, but all were withdrawn by 1923 and none were ultimately preserved.
