= London Underground departmental stock =

Overview of departmental locomotives on the London Underground

London Underground departmental locomotives
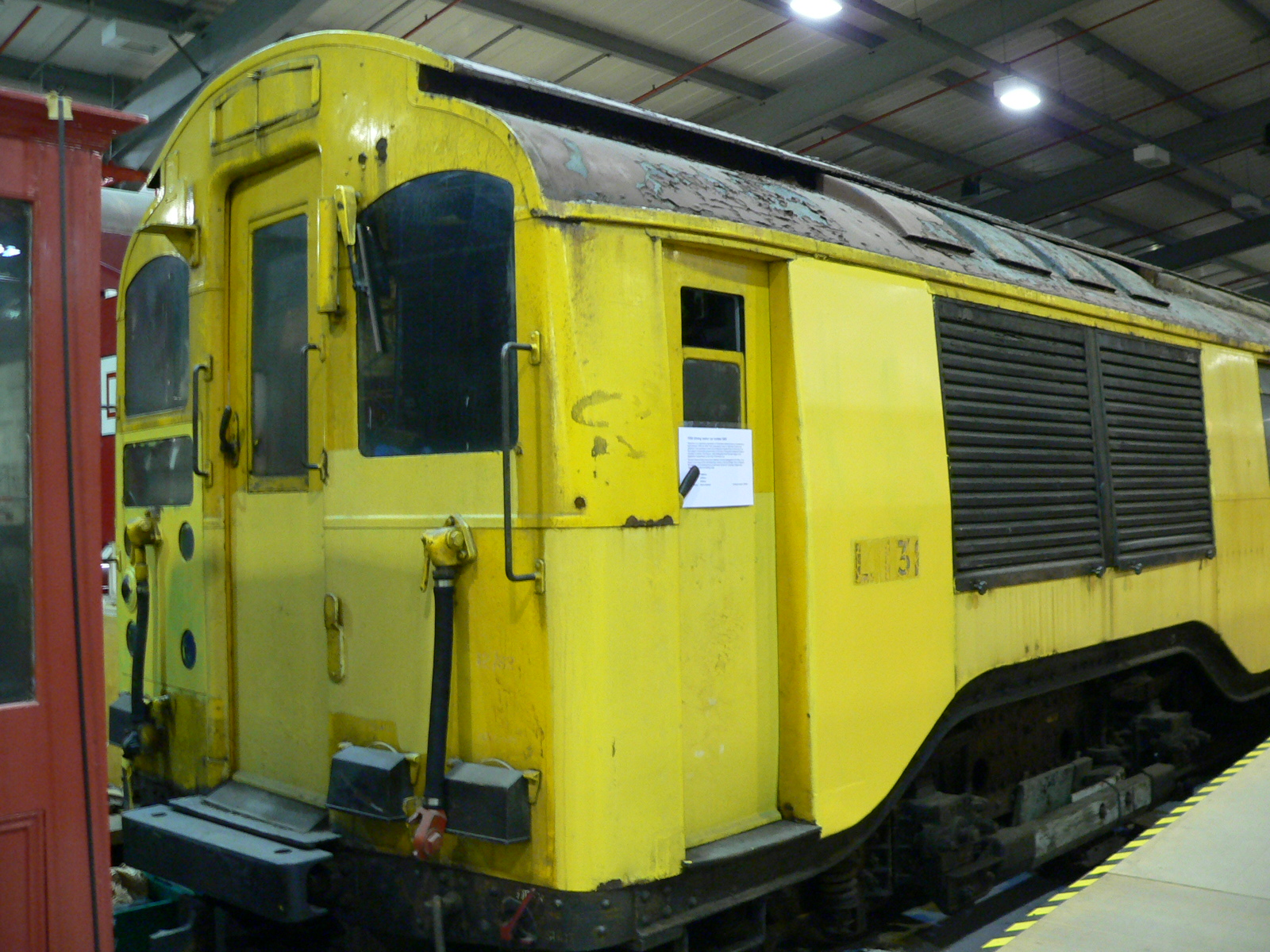
- Withdrawn pilot motor car L131 awaiting restoration at the London Transport Museum depot
- Stock type: Deep-level tube

Departmental locomotives on the London Underground consist of vehicles of a number of types which are used for engineering purposes. These include battery locomotives, diesel locomotives, electric locomotives, sleet locomotives, pilot motor cars and ballast motor cars. Details of the first four types are covered elsewhere. Pilot motor cars and ballast motor cars are generally vehicles which have been withdrawn from passenger service, but continue to be used by the engineering department. Pilot motor cars are used to move other vehicles around the system, while ballast motor cars are used to haul ballast trains and engineering trains.

The first ballast motor cars were former trailer cars built for the Central London Railway in 1900, which were converted to motor cars for trials of the first multiple system to be used in Britain, and were retained for departmental use after 1903. These were followed by French and Hungarian Gate stock cars, built in 1906, which were converted in the 1920s and 1930s. The next batch consisted of 14 standard stock cars converted in 1953. Rolling stock reorganisation and replacement in the 1970s on the District and Metropolitan lines resulted in a number of surface stock cars being used for pilot motor duties. Subsequently, motor cars of 1938 stock and 1960 stock were used for this purpose, and complete 4-car units of 1962 stock.

The London Underground has also owned several departmental self-powered vehicles designed for other duties. These include a tunnel cleaning train, consisting of two 1938 stock motor cars and three purpose-built cars, which act like a giant vacuum cleaner, and can hold 6 tons of dust before the filter tanks need to be emptied. Three Plasser & Theurer track tamping machines were purchased in 1980, and two Unimog road-rail vehicles were obtained in 1983 and 1986, for use as depot shunters.

== Early ballast motor cars ==
When the Central London Railway opened in 1900, it used camel-back electric locomotives hauling six-car trains. The locomotives weighed 44 tons and were largely unsprung, causing severe vibration problems in properties near the line. In an effort to resolve the problem, four of the coaches were fitted with motors, in the first trial in Britain of the Sprague-Thomson-Houston multiple unit control system. The trials were a success, and multiple unit trains were running by 1903. Two of the trial cars, numbers 201 and 202, were retained and became the first ballast motor cars to work on the Underground. They worked in this form until about 1910, when batteries were fitted. They were renumbered L22 and L23 in 1929, and were scrapped in 1936 and 1937.

The next batch of ballast motor cars were French-built gate stock cars, originally constructed in 1906, but converted in the early 1920s to run with the 1920 air-door stock. 20 motor cars were converted, but were replaced by more modern cars in 1930. Although 12 of the displaced cars were scrapped, six were kept as ballast motor cars, becoming numbers L24 to L29 in the service fleet. The final two were further converted to run as single cars on the Aldwych shuttle. During the Second World War they were used as pilot motor cars for refreshment trains on the Piccadilly line, which supplied food to people sleeping on the stations to escape from the bombing of the city. They returned to the Aldwych shuttle between 1946 and 1949, but were again used as pilot motor cars after that, transferring cars between the engineering works at Acton and various depots. They were both coupled to a flat wagon for a period, and were used to transfer stores from Acton Works to Northfields depot, and also took stores to Croxley Green and Queen's Park depots on the Bakerloo line.

Four Hungarian-built gate stock motor cars were used as ballast motor cars, and were numbered L13 to L16. The final one was stored in 1955, in the hope that it would be restored and preserved, but by 1960, the project appeared to be too costly, and so the gate end of the car was cut off, and the rest of it was scrapped. After refurbishment, the gate was displayed at the London Transport Museum. A further four Hungarian motor cars from the Piccadilly line were used as pilot motor cars during the reconstruction of the Hampstead line in 1922, and were numbered L17 to L20. Once a spur between the Hampstead line and the Piccadilly line at King's Cross St Pancras station was opened on 27 March 1927, it became much easier to transfer ballast motor cars between lines. The 14 departmental vehicles which were operational in 1934 continued to be used until 1953, by which time their age made maintenance very difficult. They were replaced over the next two years and scrapped.

== Standard stock cars ==
In 1953, fourteen standard stock motor cars were withdrawn from passenger service, and were converted to ballast motor cars, with the final one completed in early 1955. All of the vehicles chosen had been built in 1923, four by Cammell Laird and ten by the Metropolitan Carriage Wagon & Finance Co. At least three of them were chosen because they were at Acton Works for repairs to collision damage. They were numbered L62 to L75, and were painted grey. In 1957, they were all repainted in Metropolitan maroon. L72 was the first to be scrapped, after a collision in 1963. At the time, the standard stock was being withdrawn and replaced by 1959/62 Stock, and so rather than repair it, it was replaced by a 1927 motor car. The replacement also carried the number L72. A 1931 motor car was used to replace L73 when it was badly damaged in 1967, but in this case it carried a new number, becoming L77. During the 1970s, the ballast motor cars were gradually withdrawn. The last two to be used were L63 and L68, which performed leaf-clearing duties in late 1977, and all had been scrapped by September 1978.

While single passenger cars were sometimes moved around the system, either between depots or to Acton Works, these movements were infrequent, and when they were necessary, standard stock motor cars borrowed from the passenger fleet were normally used. Following the introduction of the 1959 passenger stock, single cars and parts of units were moved around much more frequently, and normal passenger motor cars could not be used to perform this task, as the equipment they needed to operate was spread around the unit, rather than confined to the motor car. Eight Standard Stock motor cars, dating from 1927 and 1934, were therefore allocated as pilot motor cars. In 1967, they were painted maroon, numbered L130 to L137, and became part of the ballast motor fleet. Four were withdrawn in 1971 without performing this work, however. Following withdrawal, L137 was shipped to the Isle of Wight, to replace a car on the Island Line which had been damaged. The remaining four cars worked as two pairs, and were still working as pilot motor cars in 1987, but had been withdrawn by 1993.

== Surface stock cars ==
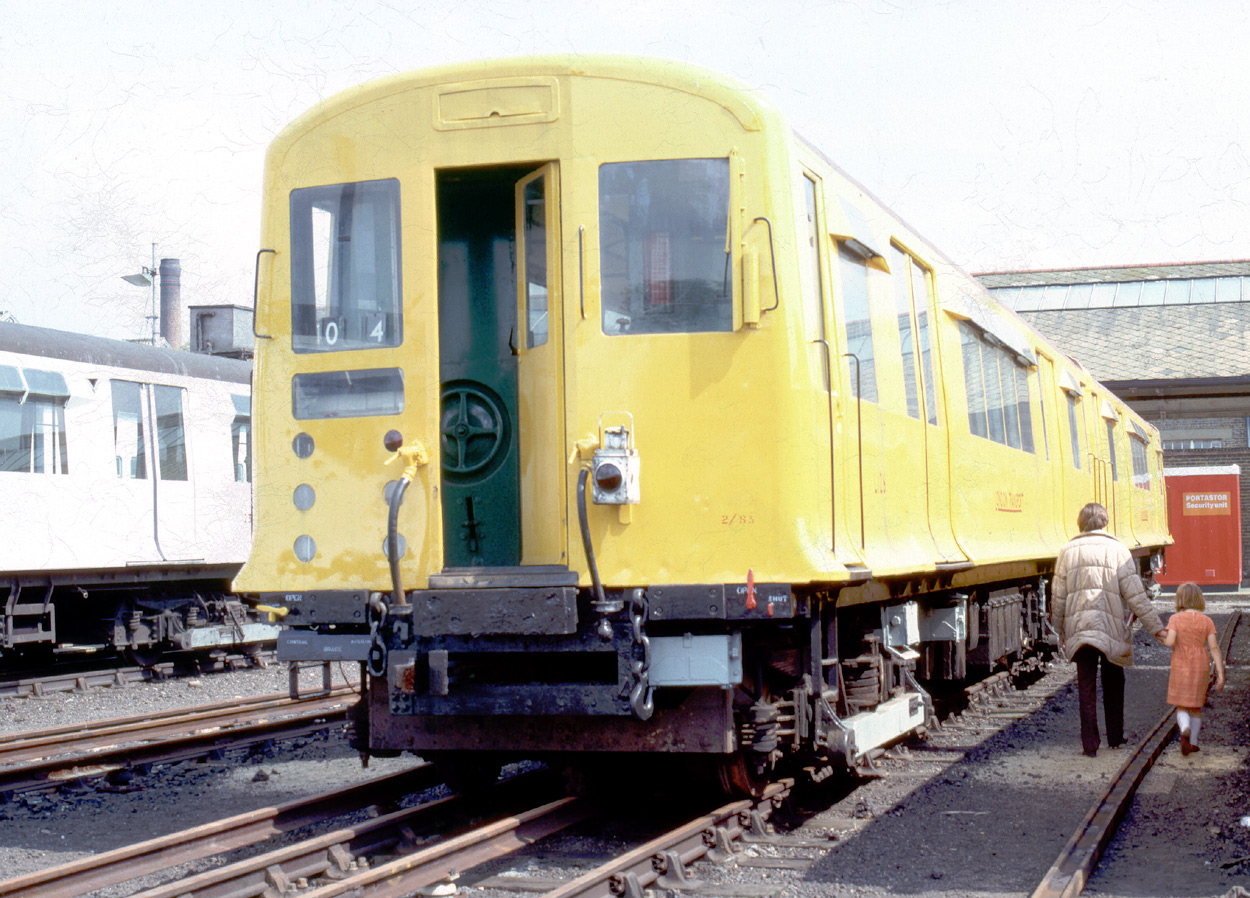
A Q38 pilot motor car at Acton Works in 1983, soon after a yellow livery was applied

From time to time, the Underground has needed to move surface stock cars around the system, and several motor cars have been set aside as pilot motor cars for this purpose. In 1971, the trains on the District line were rearranged into 7-car units, and in 1974, District line stock was removed from the East London line. This resulted in a large number of spare cars, which were transferred to Ruislip Depot for eventual scrapping. One Q23 stock motor car and one Q27 stock motor car were allocated as pilot motor cars for this task in 1967, but did not receive departmental numbers. They also toured the system with a gauging car, to check clearances. They were joined by four Q38 stock motor cars in 1971, which were renumbered L126 to L129 in 1972. Shunting of the scrap cars and the new stock being delivered in Ruislip Depot between 1970 and 1972 was handled by six pilot motor cars, two each drawn from Q23, Q27 and Q38 stock. Four were scrapped in 1972, and the final two in 1974. L126 and L127 were painted yellow in 1983, They were subsequently repainted in red, and their departmental numbers were replaced by their original passenger car numbers. Following withdrawal, they have been retained by the London Transport Museum.

When delivery of C77 stock began in 1977, two pairs of CO/CP stock motor cars were used as pilot motor cars to shunt the new stock at Ruislip Depot, and to marshall the scrap stock displaced by the new units. The C77 stock could be driven under its own power to Hammersmith Depot, as it was commissioned at Ruislip. The D78 stock was different, in that delivery was still to Ruislip, but the commissioning took place at Ealing Common Depot, and therefore pilot motor cars were needed to transfer the stock. Two pairs of CO/CP stock motor cars were allocated to do this in 1979, with a further three pairs joining them in 1980. New trains were transferred with a pilot motor car at each end, as were trains that were withdrawn for scrapping. The pilot motor cars carried large stencils at both ends, so that they would not accidentally be scrapped until their duties were complete. Three pairs of R stock motor cars were used as pilot motor cars after the R stock was scrapped. Most of the surface stock pilot motor cars were scrapped when the deliveries were complete, although one each of the CO/CP and R stock cars have been privately preserved.

== Tube stock cars ==
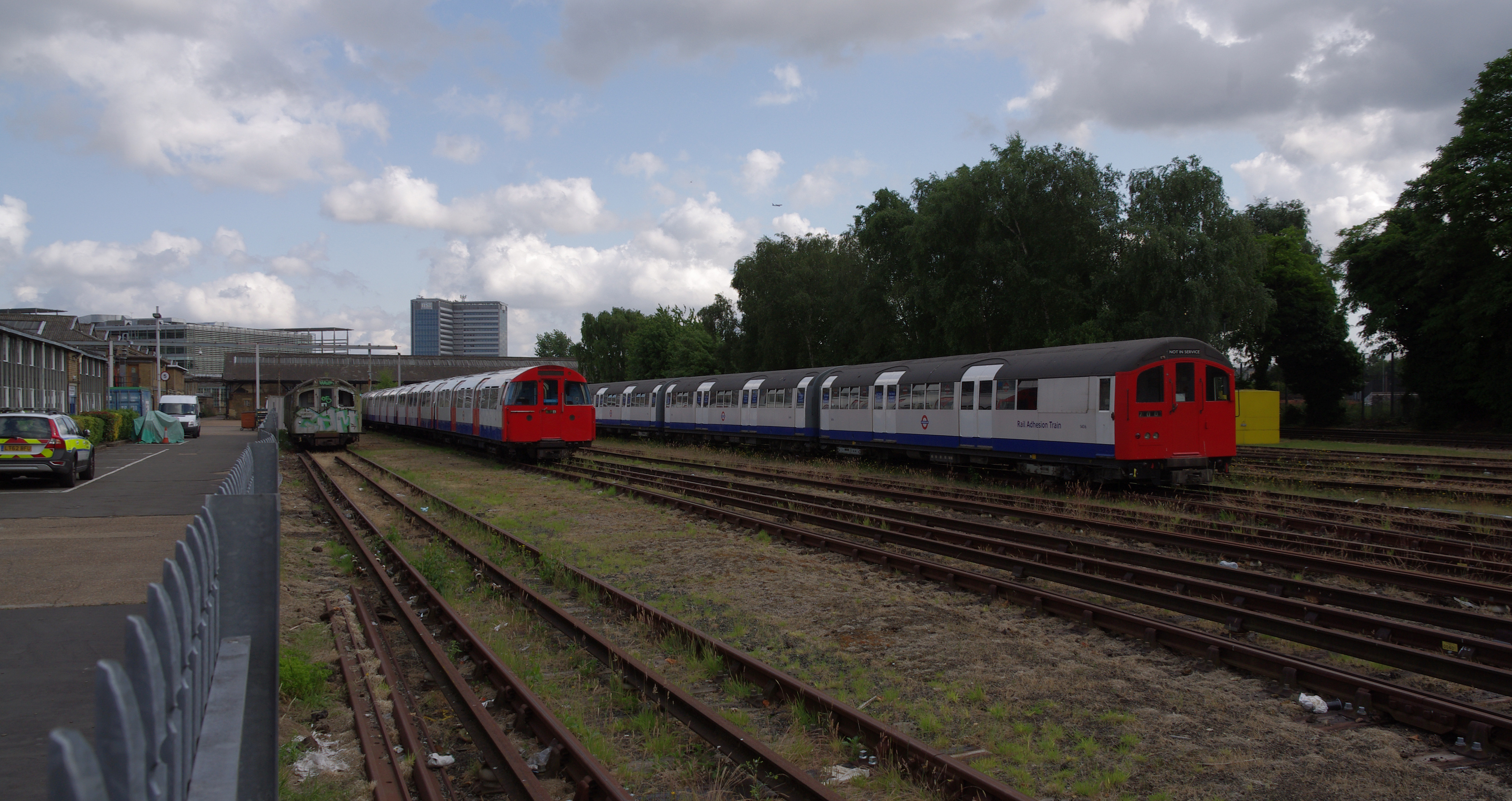
Various tube stock trains, including the Rail Adhesion Train, at Acton Works.

Deliveries of 1972 stock enabled 1938 stock to be withdrawn, and several cars were converted for use as ballast motor cars. The task was more complicated than for earlier stock, as 1938 units had compressors mounted on the trailer cars. The motor cars therefore had to be fitted with compressors, and the couplings were changed from Wedglock to Ward type. The first four were numbered L140 to L143, and the conversion was carried out at Acton Works in 1972. Another six were converted, two in 1975, two in 1976, and the final two in 1977, which were numbered L144 to L149. L151 and L152 were converted in 1978, and were additionally fitted with weed killing equipment. Another four were added in the same year, numbered L153 to L156. Although the ballast motor cars were normally worked in pairs, some engineering trains had a ballast motor car at one end and a battery locomotive at the other. One advantage of the ballast motor cars over battery locomotives was that the interiors could be used by personnel and for storing small tools, although they were less powerful, and could only work when the traction current was switched on. By 2002, all except the weed killing pair had been withdrawn.

Two of the 1960 stock cars were converted to work as pilot motor cars in 1987. The conversion was carried out at British Rail Engineering Limited's Derby Litchurch Lane Works. They were numbered L132 and L133, and were used to haul a track recording car around the system. The recording car is numbered TRC666, and was converted from a 1973-built trailer car.

27 cars of 1962 stock, supplemented by three cars of 1959 stock, were retained after most of that stock was withdrawn. These were formed into seven 4-car units, which were used as pilot motor units, while the remaining two cars were used for training by the Emergency Response Unit of the British Transport Police. Two units were fitted with Automatic Train Protection (ATP) equipment to allow them to work on the Central line, two were based at Ruislip Depot, and two were owned by TransPlant. The seventh unit was stored at Ruislip by 2002, waiting for disposal. The units were not renumbered in the engineering series and continued to carry their passenger fleet numbers. One of the driving motor cars based at Ruislip was repainted in olive green.

== Other self-powered vehicles ==
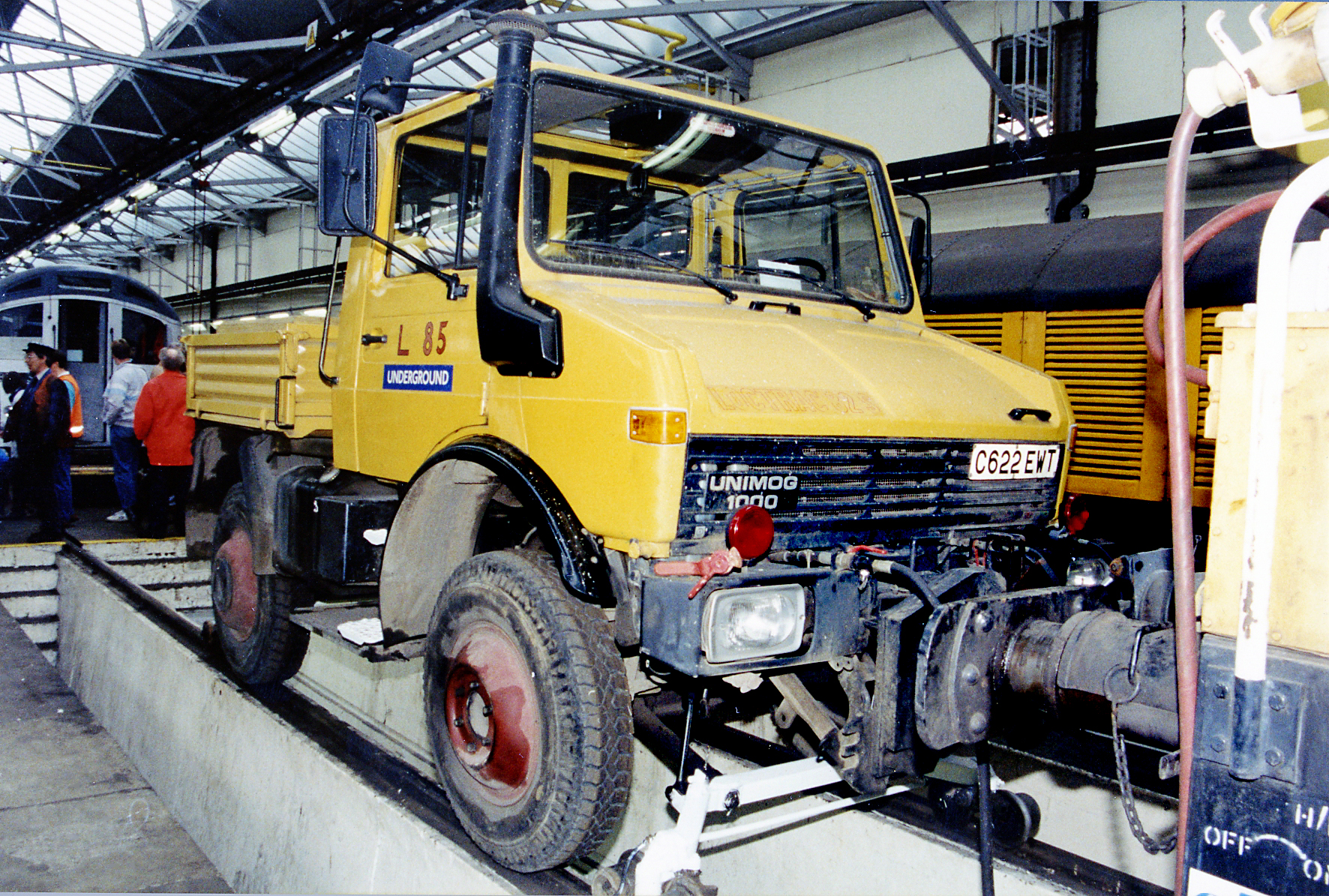
L85, one of two Unimog road-rail vehicles, parked inside Ruislip Depot

London Underground has owned a small number of departmental vehicles which were not ballast motor or pilot motor cars. Between 1935 and 1950, the District line had a weed-killing train, initially consisting of a 1905-built B stock driving motor car and a control trailer. The two cars were kept at Ealing Common depot, but the control trailer was scrapped in 1937 and replaced by a second motor car, to provide more power. Weed-killing duties were not carried out during the Second World War, and the vehicles were not refurbished subsequently. They were scrapped in 1950.

In 1977, a tunnel-cleaning train was completed. This consisted of two 1938 driving motor cars, and three purpose-built vehicles. The middle vehicle of the five contains a fan unit, which supplies large volumes of low pressure air to a series of nozzles, which disturb the dust on the tunnel walls and track. The cars on either side of it draw the dust-laden air into filter chambers, and are fitted with conveyors for discharging the dust at depots. To enable the train to operate sufficiently slowly for the cleaning process to be effective, a hydraulic drive was fitted to one of the motor cars, with settings to allow speeds of 0.5 mph (0.8 km/h), 1.5 mph (2.4 km/h), 4.5 mph (7.2 km/h) and 6 mph (9.7 km/h). Up to 6 tons of dust can be held in the filter bags, and the units are fitted with carbon dioxide and water mist fire fighting equipment, because of the combustible nature of fine dust particles. There were teething problems when the train began work in 1978, but by 1980, these had been resolved.

In 2002, the company also owned three Plasser & Theurer track maintenance machines, which were built in 1980. One was fitted with ATP equipment to allow it to work on the Central line. They had previously owned six other tamping machines, which were acquired between 1959 and 1975. The 1959 model was scrapped in 1970, and the oldest four of the others were withdrawn in 1984 and 1985. One of the machines built in 1967 went to the Southern Steam Trust at Swanage, and another, built in 1973, was acquired by the Severn Valley Railway.

In 1983 and 1986, London Underground purchased two Unimog road-rail vehicles, which were used as depot shunters. They are fitted with small railway wheels just outside the road tyres, which can be lowered when working in railway mode, and ensure that the road wheels run along the top of the rails. They are numbered L84 and L85. They previously owned a Unimog tractor-trailer pair of vehicles, purchased in 1982, which were used for leaf-clearing duties. Nozzles on the tractor unit were used to suck up the leaves, which were then stored in a 570-cubic-foot (16 m^{3}) bin mounted in the trailer.

Since 2002, a diesel-powered rail grinding unit owned by Schweerbau GmbH & Co. KG has been hired for track maintenance purposes.
