= London Underground Standard Stock =

Class of railway cars

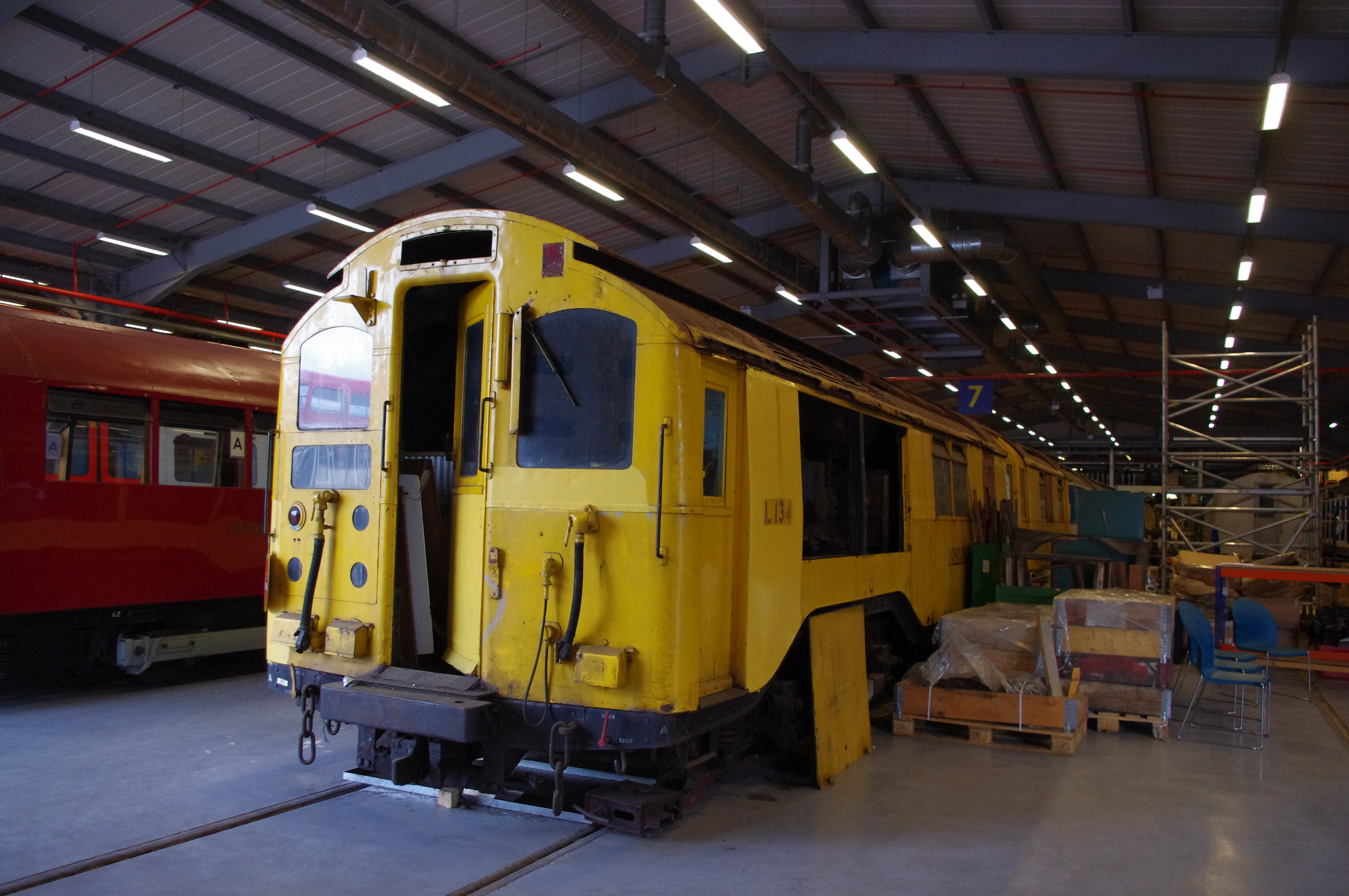
- A 1927 Standard Stock train
- Stock type: Deep-level tube
- In service: 1923-1966 (London Transport); 1967-1992 (Isle of Wight)
- Manufacturers: Birmingham RC&W Co.; Cammell Laird; Union Construction Company; Gloucester RC&W Co.; Leeds Forge Company; Metro Cammell
- Lines served: Bakerloo line Central line Northern line Piccadilly line

The Standard Stock title was applied to a variety of Tube stock built between 1923 and 1934, all of which shared the same basic characteristics, but with some detailed differences. This design is sometimes referred to as 1923 Tube Stock, 1923 Stock, or Pre 1938 Stock. Most of the Standard Stock was built to replace the first generation of "Gate Stock" Tube trains or to provide additional trains for extensions built in the 1920s and early 1930s. Standard Stock cars consisted of motor cars, with a driver's cab, behind which was a "switch compartment" occupying approximately one-third of the length of the car, plus trailer cars and "control trailers", with a driving cab but no motor. All were equipped with air operated sliding doors. The guard's door on the earlier trains was a manually operated, inward-opening hinged door.

== 1922 Stock prototype cars ==
For evaluation purposes, in anticipation of the large number of cars that were to be built over the next several years, six experimental cars were ordered and had been delivered by February 1923. There were five trailers and one control trailer, which were marshalled between French-built "Gate Stock" driving motor cars. A demonstration for the press took place on the Piccadilly line in February 1923, after which the new cars and the French motor cars were moved by road to the Hampstead Line, entering service in August. The French motor cars were part of a batch of 20 which had been rebuilt with air-operated doors, to allow them to work with the 1920 Stock, the first batch of vehicles built with air doors. The trailers and French motor cars formed the inaugural train on the Hampstead Line extension from Golders Green to Hendon when it opened on 19 November 1923.

The builders were given a partial specification, which ensured that each car would have 48 seats and two sets of air-operated double doors on each side, providing an opening which was 4 feet 6 inches (1.372 m) wide. Beyond these basic guidelines, each builder was allowed to build a trailer car to its own design, although externally, they looked very similar. The control trailer was designed by the Underground Electric Railways. The stock became known as the 1922 Stock or Competition Stock and was considered part of the Standard stock fleet.

== Production stock ==
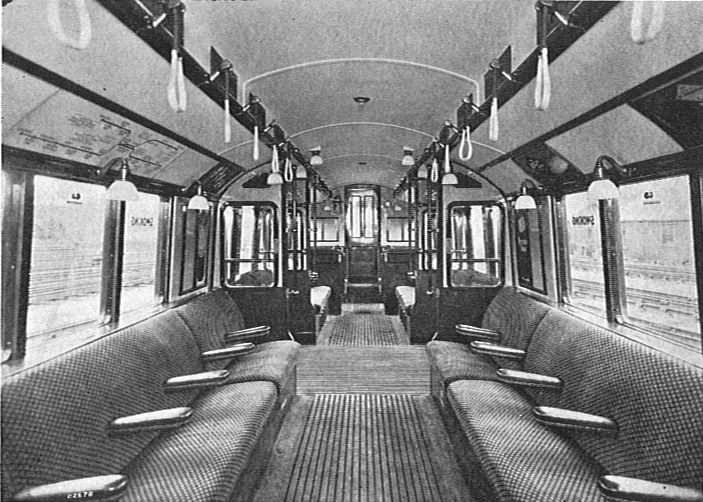
Interior

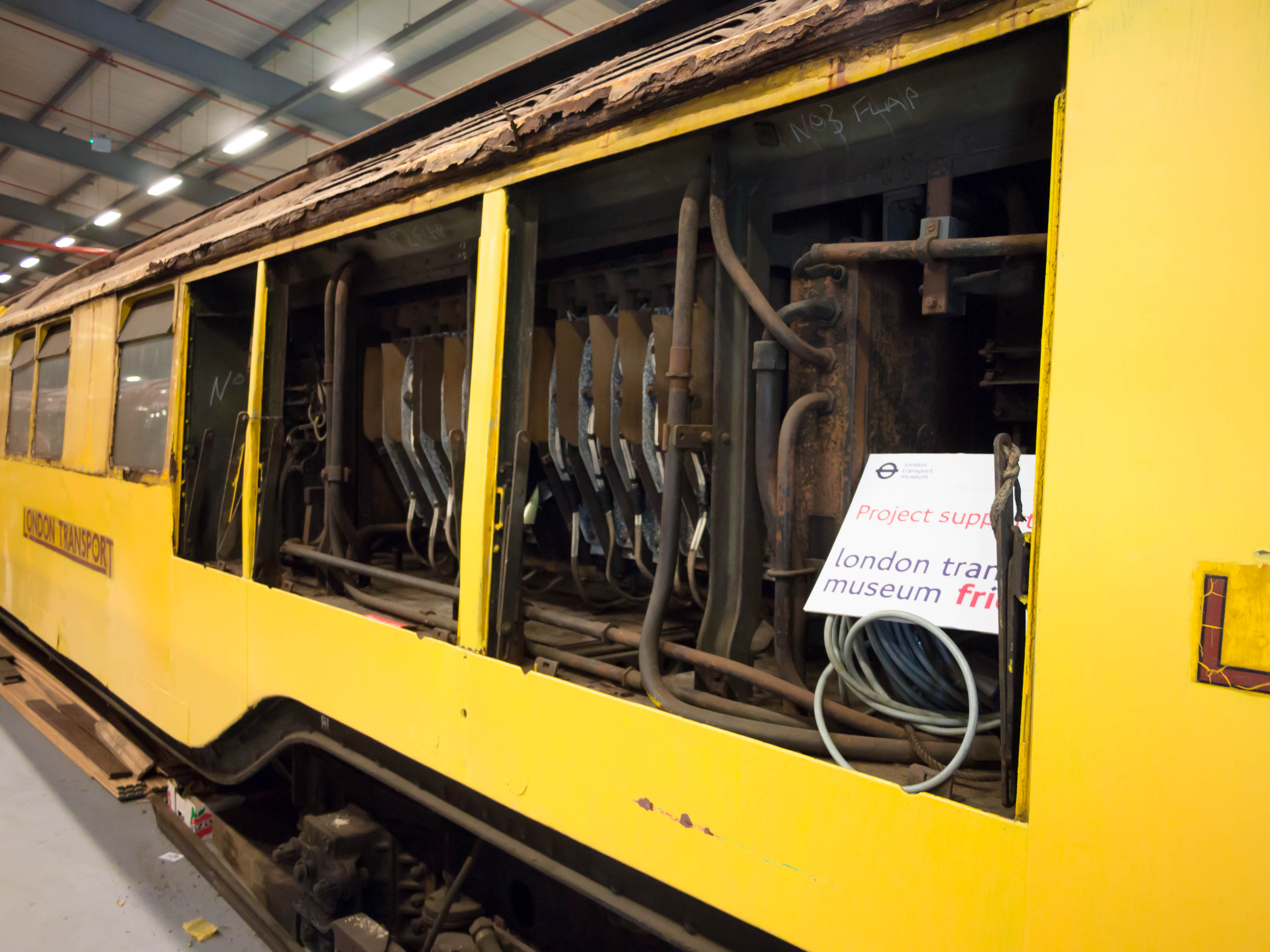
Switch compartment

The earliest Standard Stock was built for use on the Hampstead tube, which was extended from Golders Green to Edgware and from Clapham Common to Morden in 1923, as well as incorporating the City and South London Railway, which had been rebuilt with larger tunnels. 191 cars were ordered from three manufacturers in 1923, which were formed into five-car trains. The City and South London Railway had been built with tunnels which were only 10 feet 6 inches (3.20 m) in diameter, and had used small electric locomotives to haul trailer cars, until it closed for rebuilding in 1923. The reconstruction was completed in 1925, and 69 of the new vehicles were owned by them, while the rest were owned by the London Electric Railway Company.

In a departure from previous practice, where all traction control equipment had been supplied by British Thomson-Houston (BTH), most of the batch were fitted with equipment by Metropolitan-Vickers, which consisted of electro-magnetic contactors arranged to manage the acceleration of the train automatically, with switching from series to parallel connection of the motors handled by bridging them rather than open-circuiting them. Two motor cars had equipment by General Electric Co (GEC), which worked similarly, and was required to work in multiple with the Metropolitan-Vickers equipment. All the vehicles used a C-type door operating engine, which proved to be a poor design.

Another 127 cars were ordered in 1924, with most of the motor cars and some of the control trailers using GEC equipment. Cars with GEC controls used WT54 motors. Those with Metropolitan-Vickers equipment used MV152 motors, and although they were interchangeable in theory, in practice they were always kept in pairs. The 1924 cars were fitted with a D-type door engine. This was reclassified as a DL-type after a minor modification had to be made. It proved much more resilient than the earlier C-type, and was used on all Standard Stock until 1931.

Delivery of the cars was not easy, as the Hampstead Line did not have a mainline railway connection to any other line. The bodies and bogies were delivered by road, and two large gantries were erected at both the Morden and Golders Green depots. A traction engine would arrive at the site with the body, and would position it below the gantries. It would then be raised so that the road wheels could be removed, and a steam crane would position the bogies onto the track. Once the body and bogies were united, a steam engine would remove the complete car, to allow the next one to be assembled.

A further 120 cars were ordered in 1925, with both types of equipment, to cope with the opening of the junction at Kennington and the lengthening of trains to six cars and from 1926, seven cars. Motor cars seated 30 passengers, while trailers had 48 seats. Control trailers had a cab at one end, but no switch compartment, and so seated 44. Trains initially had a crew of three, consisting of a motorman, a front conductor, and a rear guard. The guard signalled the conductor that the train was ready to go, and the conductor signalled the motorman.

Once the use of air-operated doors had proved to be successful, modifications were made to enable a train to be operated by a crew of two. Changes included the fitting of a telephone, so that the guard and motorman could communicate, interlocks to ensure that all doors were closed, and the re-routing of the starting bell, so that it could be operated by a guard at the rear of the train, rather than the conductor at the front. These changes were completed by 1927, allowing the reduction of the train crew.

=== 1926 and 1927 builds ===
The superior nature of the new trains helped to show up the inadequacies of plans to convert large numbers of gate stock cars to have air doors, and they were largely abandoned. Another 112 cars, all fitted with GEC equipment, were ordered from Metropolitan Carriage Wagon and Finance in 1926. An order for 170 cars followed on in 1927. This enabled trains to be increased to seven cars, and more trains to be operated. A second order was placed with MCWF in 1927, for 136 more cars.

The traction control equipment was supplied by British Thomson-Houston. Their equipment generally proved to be more reliable, and previous batches of Standard Stock were modified so that the main contactors could be replaced with BTH equipment. BTH continued to be the preferred supplier for this equipment for the next 35 years. Metropolitan-Vickers supplied their own motors. Standard Stock built by other manufacturers used GEC motors. The inter-operability of cars from several manufacturers with three types of traction control was the reason that they were called Standard Stock.

The 1927 builds used a 'Z' bogie, instead of the previous 'Y' bogie, which had wheels of 36 inches (91 cm) diameter, as opposed to 40 inches (100 cm). This required a modification to the WT54 motors, supplied by GEC, which were then known as WT54A motors. The gearing was altered so that cars with either size of wheels remained compatible. Trials with the 'loudaphone' system by which the guard and motorman could communicate on this stock resulted in it being retro-fitted to the earlier stock.

During this period, many of the Gate Stock cars on the Central line had been converted to air-door operation by the Union Construction Co., which was based at Feltham. Plans were briefly formulated to convert the Gate Stock on the Piccadilly and Bakerloo lines, but analysis showed that the cost of building a new car was only slightly more than the cost of converting an old one, and so an order for 182 new cars was placed. They were known as the 1927 Feltham Stock. Their door plates carried the date 1928, and they were not delivered until 1929 and 1930. The lightweight construction caused problems in later years, when the seat risers and body bolsters developed fractures. With the batch of cars built by MCWF and fitted with BTH equipment, these vehicles enabled Gate Stock to be withdrawn from the Piccadilly line in June 1929, and from the Bakerloo line on 1 January 1930.

=== 1929 and 1930 builds ===
Another 53 cars were ordered from the Union Construction Co. in 1929, to enable the remaining 1920 Stock cars, which had air doors but were not really suitable for operation on the open sections of the Piccadilly line, to be transferred to the Bakerloo line. An extra train of two motor cars and four trailers was ordered in 1930, to test several new features. They were the last cars to be built by the Union Construction Co., for it was closed as a result of political pressure in 1932. The new motor cars were 1 foot (0.30 m) longer, and the trailers were 2 feet (0.61 m) longer. This was achieved by tapering one or both ends, to prevent them fouling the structure gauge on curves. On two of the trailers, the centre door openings were widened from 4 ft 6 in (1.37 m) to 5 ft 2 in (1.57 m). On the other two, the width of the centre doors was not altered, but the seating capacity was reduced from 48 to 40, to allow the provision of an additional single-leaf door at both ends of the car. The position of the guard's door control panel was altered, although this was not found to be satisfactory, and was dropped from subsequent builds.

Because of the Piccadilly extensions, which were above ground, heaters were fitted, and the use of British materials in its construction was used for publicity purposes, at a time when there was an industrial depression. It became known as the 'All British' train, and operated on the Piccadilly and Northern lines. Transfer between the two was aided by the construction of a junction at Kings Cross in 1927. The Northern line offered heavier traffic, with which to assess the effectiveness of the new features. 62 production cars were ordered from Metropolitan-Cammell, which was formed from the Metropolitan Carriage Wagon and Finance Co. and Cammell Laird at this time, for delivery to the Bakerloo line. They replaced the Watford Joint Stock, which although relatively new, needed a larger crew and had to stop for longer at stations, because of its swing doors. Problems with the swing doors were highlighted by a fatal accident in which a passenger got caught in them, but the door interlock did not detect it.

This build was not initially compatible with other builds, because it was fitted with an electro-pneumatic braking system, as well as the Westinghouse air brake. To accommodate its control, an extra 10-core control jumper was fitted. Previous builds of Standard Stock were gradually altered to include the extra wires, a process which was largely completed by 1936. Standard Stock motor cars which were running on the Bakerloo line with Cammell Laird 1920 Stock trailers were not fitted with the electro-pneumatic brake wiring until the trailers were withdrawn in 1938.

=== 1931 and 1934 builds ===
In 1929, government aid enabled plans for extensions to the Piccadilly line northwards to Cockfosters and westwards from Hammersmith to Acton Town, on tracks which were parallel to the District line but not shared with it, to come to fruition. The length of the line increased from 8.5 miles (13.7 km) to 40 miles (64 km), and so more trains were needed. The improvements made for the 1930 build were incorporated into the design, as well as some new features. 145 motor cars were ordered from Metropolitan-Cammell, and 130 trailer cars were shared between two builders. All trailer cars had 12 doors, with two sets of double doors and a single-leaf door at both ends on each side. Electro-pneumatic brakes were fitted, as was a weak-field control, which enabled higher speed running and had been tested on the 1930 build. Its use on the Northern line had demonstrated that the same service intervals could be maintained with four fewer trains.

The final build of Standard Stock was a small batch of 26 motor cars ordered from Metropolitan-Cammell in 1934, after the formation of the London Passenger Transport Board in the previous year. The Piccadilly line was extended from South Harrow to Uxbridge, and this required an extra eight seven-car trains. These were made up from the new motor cars and some reshuffling of stock between other lines. Although very similar to the 1931 build, there were some minor differences. The 1931 build had used motors with roller bearings for the first time, and ten of the new motor cars were also fitted with roller bearing axle boxes, to reduce the amount of maintenance required with white metal bearings. With the completion of the 1934 build, the total number of Standard Stock cars was 645 motor cars, 551 trailers and 270 control trailers.

== Allocation ==
By the time the final cars had been delivered, the standard stock was operating on the Northern, Piccadilly and Bakerloo lines. There were 724 cars on the Northern line, consisting of 336 motor cars, 243 trailers and 145 control trailers. This group comprised all of the cars made in 1923, 1924, 1925 and 1926, supplemented by 62 per cent of the 1927 build by Metropolitan, and 13 of the 1927-built Feltham cars. The Piccadilly line had 509 cars, comprising some of the 1927 Metropolitan and Feltham batches, most of the 1929 Feltham stock, the experimental 1930 Feltham train, and all of the 1931 and 1934 stock. The Bakerloo line also had some of the 1927 Metropolitan and Feltham batches, four cars from the 1929 Feltham build and the 1930 Metropolitan stock. This was a total of 198 cars, made up of 82 motor cars, 62 trailers and 54 control trailers. To make up the number of trains, an additional 20 trailers and 20 control trailers were needed, and these were cars of 1920 Cammell Laird air-door stock.

Between 1935 and 1940, the London Underground benefited from a New Works Programme worth £40 million. This included extensions to the Northern line and the Central line, with delivery of new trains of 1938 Stock beginning in May 1938. The intention was to run the new trains on the Northern line, and transfer the displaced Standard Stock to the Central line, which was using stock built in 1900–1903. In addition, some of the displaced stock would be used on the Moorgate-Finsbury Park "Highbury Branch", also known as the Northern City Line, and some would be used to increase the length of trains on the Bakerloo line to seven cars. 82 control trailers were converted to trailers, and 21 driving motor cars were altered from "A" cars to "D" cars, as the makeup of 7 car trains on the Bakerloo and Central lines had the three-car unit at the opposite end to those on the Northern line.

The Northern City Line had previously been served by surface stock, and had to be modified to accommodate the Standard Stock. Additionally, it had a non-standard arrangement of the third and fourth rails which supplied power to the cars, and these were modified to the same configuration as on the Northern line during the refurbishment. The use of control trailers at one end of a short train was virtually discontinued during the 1930s, because of the risks of disruption to services. A 3-car train consisted on a driving motor car, a trailer and a control trailer (DM-T-CT) and only had one compressor on the motor car. If it failed, the train was stranded, causing delays, whereas a 4-car short train had two motor cars (DM-T-T-DM) and hence two compressors. Failure of one did not prevent the train continuing. The exception to the use of control trailers was the off-peak trains on the Northern City Line, which consisted of a driving motor car and a control trailer, and these 2-car trains continued to run until October 1964.

=== Central line ===
On the Central line, Standard Stock began replacing the 1900/1903 Stock in the autumn of 1938, and this action was completed by mid-1939. The Central line used a three-rail system, with a central conductor rail supplying the power, and was not converted to a four-rail system until May 1940. All of the trains were therefore converted to work with the three-rail system as an interim measure, and then converted back to four-rail operation once the track had been modified.

At the time, extensions to West Ruislip, Epping and Hainault were under construction, which would require more trains, but the onset of the Second World War resulted in the extensions being postponed. Nearly 200 cars were stored in the partially built Hainault depot, but that was then requisitioned by the U.S. Army Transportation Corps, and the cars were moved to open sidings. Others were stored on sidings at Edgware, Golders Green, Highgate, Morden, Neasden, and Stanmore, as well as in depots where there was spare capacity. Some of the motor cars were painted grey, and used for engineering duties. Some trains were used for "Tube Refreshment Specials", supplying food and drink to people sheltering from air raids on the underground platforms.

After the war ended, the Central line extensions opened, reaching Stratford in December 1946, Newbury Park and Woodford in December 1947, West Ruislip, Loughton and Hainault in November 1948, and Epping in September 1949. The effects of six or more years of open-air storage on the Standard Stock was severe, and a programme of heavy refurbishment began, which included replacement of warped window frames, renewal of corroded equipment as necessary, and in many cases, complete rewiring. Stations had been lengthened to accommodate 8-car trains before the war, but trains were restricted to 6 cars until the depot at White City could be altered. Some 7-car trains began operating from November 1947, and 8-car trains from the following January. The reliability of the refurbished cars was poor, and a full service of 8-car trains was not achieved until additional cars became available from other lines, following the delivery of the 1959 Stock. The achievement was short-lived, as all Standard Stock had been withdrawn from the Central line less than three years later.

8-car trains were formed of two 4-car units, each consisting of two driving motor cars and two trailers (DM-T-T-DM). This arrangement was not ideal at busy times, since there was a section in the middle of the train where there were no passenger doors for almost 50 feet (15 m), caused by the switch compartments behind the driving cabs. In order to alleviate the problem, one of the four-car units was split, and two cars were placed at either end of the other unit. The formation from 1961 thus became DM-T x DM-T-T-DM x T-DM, which reduced loading times at peak periods.

== Withdrawal ==
1938 Stock replaced the Standard Stock on the Bakerloo line, the changeover being completed in May 1949. A batch of 1927-built trailers, usually referred to as "58 trailers" because of the number of cars in the group rather than a year reference, as was normally the case with Tube stock classes, were converted to operate with the new stock on the Bakerloo line. The Standard Stock on the Piccadilly line was eventually replaced by the 1959 Stock. This enabled the first large-scale withdrawals and scrapping of Standard Stock, although some of the better cars were transferred to the Central line to complete the 8-car trains.

London Transport intended to use the prototype 1960 Stock to develop new trains to replace the Standard Stock on the Central line: however, the condition of the 30–40 year-old Central line fleet were deteriorating under an intense service pattern, exacerbated by growing demand from the expansion of electric trains in the Eastern Region of British Railways. The situation escalated with a fatal electrical fire on car 3465 near Holland Park in 1958, and another (non-fatal) fire on car 3673 near Redbridge in 1960.

In response to the fires, London Transport diverted 57 of the 76 trains from the 1959 Stock to debut on the Central line instead of the Piccadilly line, and ordered another 57 non-driving motor cars that would later form part of the near-identical 1962 Stock. London Transport retained some Standard Stock cars from the Piccadilly line to replace the worst performing cars on the Central line.

London Transport withdrew the last Standard Stock trains from the Central line in June 1963. The arrival of the 1962 stock in the previous year then allowed the 1959 stock to complete the withdrawal of the Standard Stock from the Piccadilly line by July 1964. This allowed the 1938 Stock to replace the last Standard Stock trains from the Northern City Line, in November 1966.

A number of motor cars saw further service as departmental vehicles. 16 were used as ballast motor cars, with many of them lasting until 1978, and four were used as pilot motor cars. Motor car 3327 was displayed in the Science Museum, London, for many years, but returned to the London Transport Museum in 1996.

== Isle of Wight ==
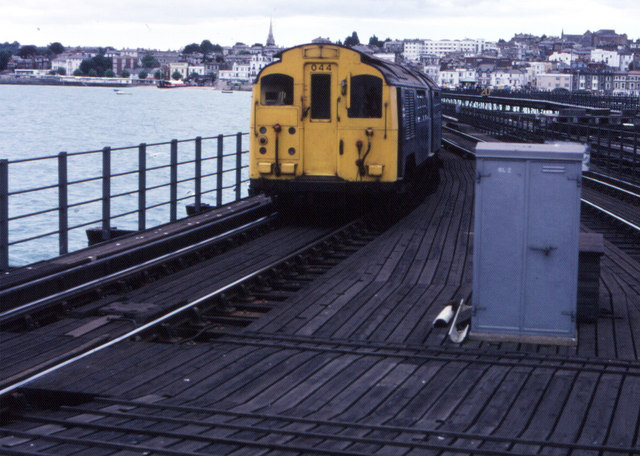
1927 Stock train arriving at Ryde Pier Head station.

Prior to 1950, there were 55.5 miles (89.3 km) of steam-operated railways on the Isle of Wight. This was reduced to 25.5 miles (41.0 km) between 1952 and 1956, and to just 8.5 miles (13.7 km) in 1966. The Ryde Pier Head–Shanklin section (the Island Line) was retained and electrified, but because of the restricted loading gauge at Ryde Tunnels, smaller-than-normal trains were required.

The Southern Region approached London Transport in 1961, to begin negotiations for some of the Standard Stock then being withdrawn. The initial plan was to fit diesel engines into the motor cars, and to use either electric or mechanical transmission. The first twelve cars were transferred from Ruislip Depot to Wimbledon in August 1964, from where they were moved to Micheldever sidings. Further cars followed in June 1965. In October, a plan to electrify the line was announced, and the idea of fitting diesel engines was dropped. In 1966, the Southern Region had 44 cars at Micheldever, and London Transport had 29 more which were set aside for the scheme. 10 of the Micheldever cars were scrapped, and 12 more were obtained from London Transport.

Overhaul of the electrical and braking systems was done at Acton Works, which involved transferring the cars from Micheldever back to London Transport. This included conversion to work with a three-rail system, rather than the standard London Transport four-rail system. The number of cars to be shipped to the Isle of Wight was reduced from 46 to 43 because of the cost of this work. After overhaul, the cars were transferred to Stewarts Lane, where they were repainted in British Rail blue, and were then taken to the Isle of Wight. They were loaded onto a road vehicle at Fratton belonging to the haulage company Pickfords, and crossed to the island on the Portsmouth to Fishbourne ferry. Care was needed to ensure that the weather and tides were suitable, and motor cars had to be transferred on special sailings, rather than regular crossings, because of the difficulty of unloading a vehicle of this weight without damaging the ship's unloading ramp.

The cars were formed into 4-car and 3-car units, initially designated as 4-VEC and 3-TIS units. They became Classes 452 and 451. They were later reclassified to become Classes 485 and 486. Apart from those cut up following accidents at Ryde depot, and other early withdrawals, most of these units were withdrawn between 1988 and 1991, when they were replaced by London Underground 1938 Stock. In October 1990, five cars were returned to London Transport, to form a Heritage Train. They worked under their own power between Fratton and Wimbledon, and were displayed at an open day at Morden Depot, celebrating 100 years of the Northern line.

== Manufacturers ==
Standard Stock is used to describe six experimental cars built by five manufacturers in 1923, and 18 batches of production cars, totalling 1460 vehicles, built by six manufacturers between 1923 and 1934. It became the most prolific class of stock to run on the Underground, which was partly due to the Trade Facilities Act 1921. This was a government initiative in the aftermath of the First World War to fund schemes which would create employment, particularly in the construction, steel and manufacturing industries. The Underground benefited from £5 million of investment from this source, which in addition to funding extensions to the Northern line, financed the construction of over 1,100 Standard Stock cars between 1922 and 1930.

Year	Builder	Number built			Notes
Year	Builder	Motors	Trailers	Control Trailers	Notes
1923	BRCW	—	1	—	Experimental stock
1923	CLCo	—	1	—	Experimental stock
1923	GRCW	—	1	1	Experimental stock
1923	Leeds	—	1	—	Experimental stock
1923	MCWF	—	1	—	Experimental stock
1923	BRCW	—	35	-	Production stock
1923	CLCo	41	40	—	Production stock
1923	MCWF	40	—	35	Production stock
1924	BRCW	—	50	—	Production stock
1924	CLCo	—	—	25	Production stock
1924	MCWF	52	—	—	Production stock
1925	CLCo	48	—	—	Production stock
1925	MCWF	—	5	67	Production stock
1926	MCWF	64	48	—	Production stock
1927	MCWF	110	160	36	Production stock
1927	UCC	77	37	68	Production stock
1929	UCC	18	17	18	Production stock
1930	MCCW	22	20	20	Production stock
1930	UCC	2	4	—	Production stock
1931	BRCW	—	90	—	Production stock
1931	GRCW	—	40	—	Production stock
1931	MCCW	145	—	—	Production stock
1934	MCCW	26	—	—	Production stock
Totals		645	551	270	Grand total: 1,466

Key to Builders

BRCW
Birmingham Railway Carriage & Wagon Co.
CLCo
Cammell Laird & Co. Ltd.
GRCW
Gloucester Railway Carriage & Wagon Co.
Leeds
Leeds Forge Company
MCCW
Metropolitan-Cammell Carriage & Wagon Company Ltd.
MCWF
Metropolitan Carriage, Wagon & Finance Co.
UCC
Union Construction Company ("Feltham")

== Preservation ==
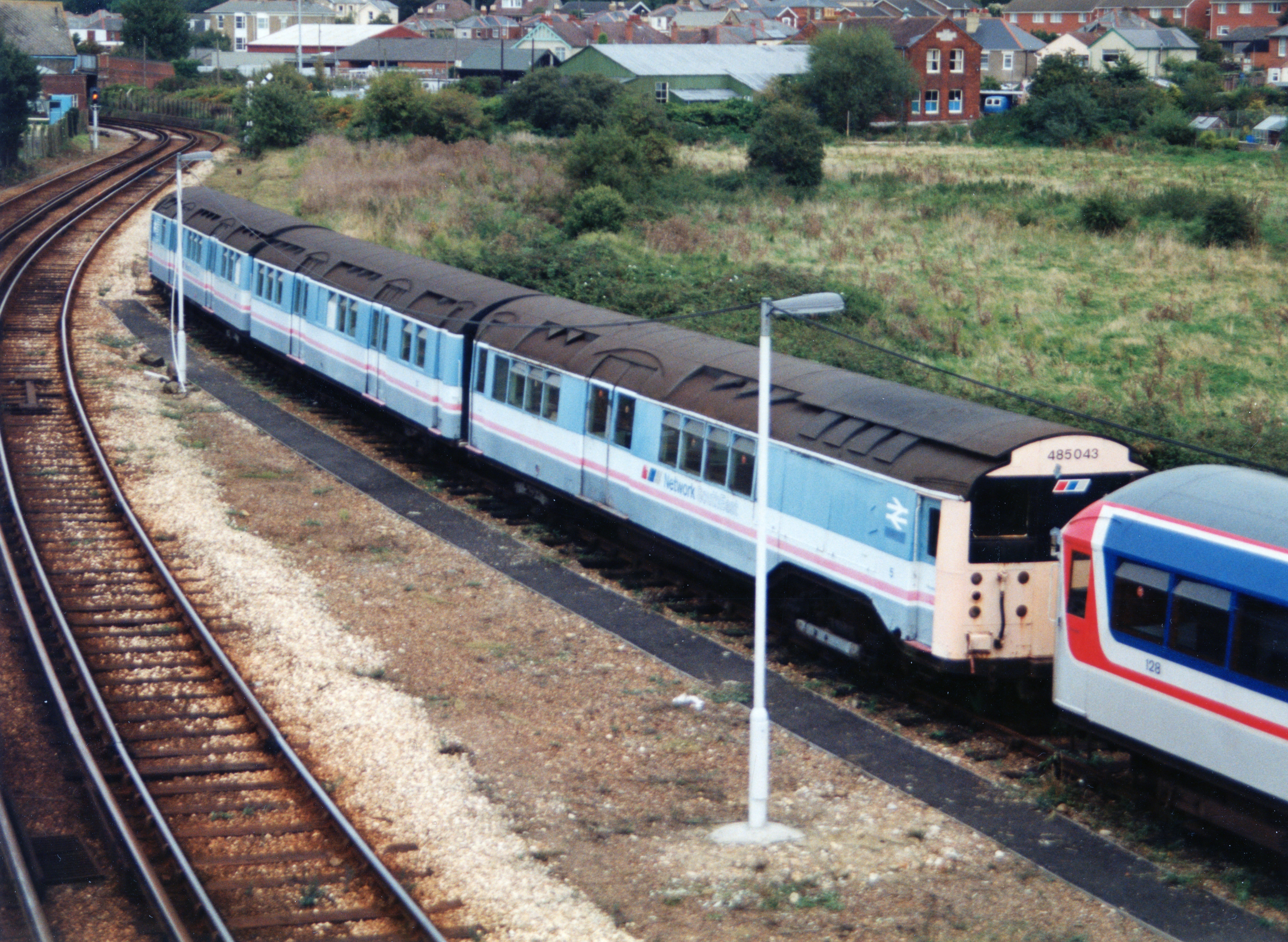
Class 485 485043 at Ryde St Johns Road in 1993 after withdrawal. Visible at bottom right is a British Rail Class 483, which succeeded the Standard Stock on the Isle of Wight.

Several vehicles have been preserved:

Number (Note: First number is last number assigned when in passenger service; second number is IoW fleet number (2–49) or LT service stock number (L13x locomotives or PC85x personnel carriers).)		Type	Built	Builder	Location
3327	—	DM	1927	MCCW	London Transport Museum, Acton Depot
3370	L134	DM	1927	MCCW	London Transport Museum, Acton Depot
3693	L131	DM	1934	MCCW	London Transport Museum, Acton Depot
5279	27	CT	1925	MCCW	London Transport Museum, Acton Depot
7296	49	T	1923	CLCo	London Transport Museum, Acton Depot

Key to Type

CT
Control Trailer
DM
Driving Motor
T
Trailer

The London Transport shunting locomotive L11 was converted from two Standard Stock cars, 3080 and 3109, in 1964. It underwent restoration in 2014 and is on static display at Epping Signalling Museum, repainted from London Underground red into engineer's yellow.

Four cars owned by the London Transport Museum have been formed into a four-car unit, consisting of DM 3370, DM 3693, CT 5279 and T 7296 at their Acton Depot. They are awaiting restoration. 2 cars - Trailer car 5279 and Control Trailer 7296 - were both in operations on the Isle of Wight as British Rail Class 485s.

Several cars that were preserved have since been scrapped.

- DM 3209 / 7 scrapped at Acton Works 2013.
- DM 3690 / L130 scrapped at Acton Works 2013.
- DM 3701 / L135 scrapped at Acton Works 2013.
- DM 3706 / 2 scrapped at Acton Works 2013.
- T 7061 / PC850 scrapped at Acton Works 2013.
- T 7063 / PC851 scrapped at Acton Works 2006.
- T 7071 / PC855 scrapped at Acton Works 2006.
- T 7281 / 44 scrapped at Acton Works 2013.

These vehicles were all stored in Acton Works up until the works claimed that they needed the space in which the trains were stored and without a place to be moved to and with them all being in deteriorating, poor condition, all the cars were scrapped.
