= London Underground 1920 Stock =

Class of English train rolling stock

1920 Stock
- Stock type: Deep-level tube
- In service: 1920–1969
- Manufacturer: Cammell Laird

The 1920 Tube Stock consisted of forty cars built by Cammell Laird in Nottingham, England. These cars were the first new tube cars to be built with air operated doors. The batch consisted of twenty trailer and twenty control trailer cars, which were formed into six-car trains by the addition of twenty French motor cars built in 1906 and modified for air-door operation. They initially ran on the Piccadilly tube, but in 1930 were considered to be drab, compared to new stock being delivered at the time. The motor cars were therefore replaced by Standard Stock units, built in 1927, and the 1920 cars were refurbished. They were transferred to the Bakerloo line in 1932, and continued to operate until 1938.

A second planned refurbishment so that they could be used on the Northern City Line shuttle service between Moorgate and Finsbury Park stations was interrupted by the Second World War, and after hostilities ceased, 35 of the cars were scrapped. The remaining five were formed into an instruction train, and were moved around the system to act as a mobile classroom until they were scrapped in 1968.

== Background ==
Following the end of the First World War, consideration was given to how the Underground service could be improved. One of the main factors in the slow running of the service was the time taken at stations to close all the doors or gates. In order to address this issue, a batch of 20 trailer and 20 control trailer cars was ordered from Cammell Laird in 1919. These were the first vehicles to be designed with air-operated doors.

In order to make up complete trains of air-operated stock, twenty "Gate Stock" driving motor cars, built in France in 1906, were reconstructed with air doors, and were normally formed into six-car trains. The cars were the forerunners to the Standard Stock, which became the most prolific group of tube stock to operate on the system, thanks in part to the Trade Facilities Act 1921. This was a government initiative to fund projects which would create employment in the aftermath of the First World War, and enabled the Treasury to inject £5 million into the Underground.

== Design ==
Each of the new cars was equipped with four doors on each side, one at each end, and a pair of doors in the middle of the car. Unlike modern designs, they closed against a wide central pillar, rather than against each other. The centre doors were 2.75 feet (0.838 m) wide, while the end doors were only 2.25 feet (0.686 m). When they opened, they moved into a pocket between the outside of the car and the seats. In order to ensure that the opening was 6 feet (1.829 m) tall, the top of the door curved inwards, following the roof line. The doors were fitted with a sensitive edge, which prevented it from closing if someone was in the door opening. However, this proved to be too sensitive, and in order to maintain the advantage of shorter times at stations, was disabled after an initial trial period.

Each door was controlled by an air engine, consisting of a large and a small cylinder, which were supplied with compressed air at 30 psi (2.1 bar; 210 kPa). The air supply was controlled by an electrical valve. At stations, this was energised, which resulted in air in the large cylinder being exhausted, and the small cylinder then opened the door. When the train was ready to depart, the valve was de-energised, admitting air to the large cylinder, and the door closed. If the air supply failed, this arrangement allowed the door to be pushed back manually.

Of the 20 French motor cars, the first two were converted by Cammell Laird. A pair of double doors were fitted in the centre of the car, and the end vestibule, which was originally fitted with gates, was enclosed and provided with a single door. These entered service in November 1920. The remaining 18 cars were adapted by Gloucester Railway Carriage and Wagon Company, with the final one completed in June 1924. There were differences in the implementation of the conversion, as the railway company was considering a plan to convert all of the gate stock cars to air-door operation, and this small batch provided an opportunity to experiment with what might be possible.

On a gate stock train, each of the cars had its own conductor, who was responsible for the operation of the doors on that car. It was originally planned to work the air operated doors in a similar fashion, but the method adopted was for all the doors on a three-car train to be controlled by a guard at the rear of the motor car. This reduced the number of staff needed to operate a six-car train from seven to three, consisting of a driver, a rear guard and a front guard.

Each guard controlled the doors on the three cars at his end of the train. The cars were initially fitted with yellow flipper arms, which protruded from the side of the vehicle when a door was open, and enabled staff to identify doors which had not yet closed. The design was unsatisfactory, and the arms were replaced by indicator lamps, interlocked to the air engines in 1924.

Traction control circuits and door operating circuits were carried along the train by 10-core jumpers, fitted at roof height between the cars. There were two lighting circuits, one fed from each of the motor cars. It was possible to operate a three-car train, but in order to do so, a shorting plug had to be fitted to the control trailer, to connect the lighting circuits, and to complete the door interlock circuit.

== Operation ==
The cars were initially used on the Piccadilly tube. The trailer cars were numbered 800-819, the converted motor cars were 480-499, and the control trailers were initially 700-719, but were renumbered to 1700-1719 in 1926. The trailers became 1316-1335 and the control trailers 2043-2062 in 1930. In 1934, following the formation of London Transport and the introduction of a standard numbering scheme, the trailers became 7230-7249, while the control trailers were given the numbers 5170-5189. The cars were considered to be drab, when compared with new stock being delivered to the Hampstead Line around 1930, and they were refurbished.

As built the cars had longitudinal seating through the length of the car, providing seats for 44 passengers. As part of the refurbishment, the central bay was fitted with transverse seats, increasing the capacity to 48, and armrests were fitted to the remaining seats. The cement floors were replaced by wooden slat flooring, and the lighting was improved. Changes were made to the couplers between the cars, and the air-doors on the driving cabs of the control trailers were replaced by swing doors. The 1906 motor cars were withdrawn, and the trains were completed by the addition of Standard Stock motor cars, built by the Metropolitan Carriage & Wagon Company in 1927.

At the time, the Piccadilly line was being extended, with the extensions involving open-air running, and the 1920 stock was unsuitable for use in wet conditions. It was transferred to the Bakerloo line between January and October 1932. Following the introduction of the 1929/30 batch of Standard Stock, which was the first to be fitted with electro-pneumatic brakes, a decision was taken to convert all of the Standard Stock to use this system. Most had been fitted with the new equipment by 1936, but the exceptions were the motor cars running with the 1920 stock. These were not converted until 1938 when the 1920 stock was withdrawn from passenger service.

Following withdrawal, two of the French motor cars were adapted so that they could be used as single cars on the Aldwych Shuttle service from Holborn to Aldwych. Others became part of the engineering stock, working as ballast motor cars. The 1920 stock cars were retired from service in 1938. It was intended to recondition them, and use them on the Northern City Line shuttle from Moorgate to Finsbury Park, but the onset of the Second World War prevented that, and they were stored at Cockfosters Depot. After the war ended, 35 of them were sold for scrap, and the remaining five became an instruction train for the Chief Mechanical Engineer. The cars were renumbered IC1075-1079, and the train was moved from depot to depot by ballast motor cars or battery locomotives. It continued to serve its training function until it was scrapped in 1968.

== Bibliography ==
- Bruce, J. Graeme (1968). Tube trains under London. London Transport Board. ISBN 978-0-85329-000-1.
- Bruce, J. Graeme (1988). The London Underground Tube Stock. Ian Allan. ISBN 978-0-7110-1707-8.
- Halliday, Stephen (2013). Underground to Everywhere. The History Press. ISBN 978-0-7524-9772-3.
- Hardy, Brian (1986). "Standard Tube Stock Part 1: 1922-1945". Underground. No. 14. London Underground Railway Society. ISSN 0306-8609.
