= London Underground 1906 Stock =

Class of train rolling stock

1906 Stock
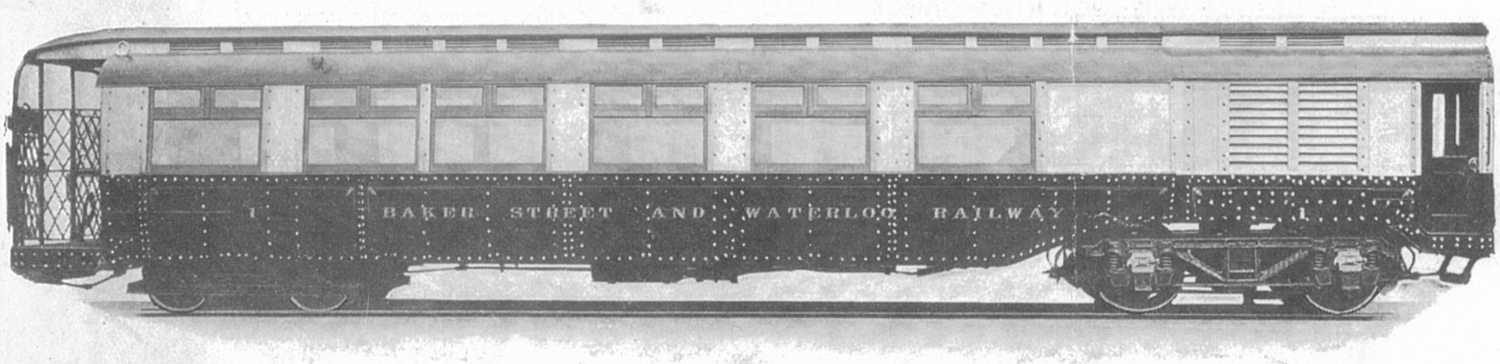
- Stock type: Deep-level tube
- In service: 1906-1953
- Manufacturer: American Car and Foundry; Les Ateliers de Construction du Nord de la France (LACN); HRC&MW; Brush Traction; Metro-Cammell

Specifications
- Car length: DM: 50 ft 3 in (15.32 m)
- Width: 8 ft 9 in (2.67 m)
- Weight: DM: 27.5 long tons (27.9 t; 30.8 short tons)
- Seating: DM: 36

The 1906 Stock, also known as "Gate Stock", was built for the Yerkes tube lines, Baker Street and Waterloo Railway (BS&WR), Great Northern, Piccadilly and Brompton Railway (GNP&BR), and Charing Cross, Euston and Hampstead Railway (CCE&HR).

== Construction ==
=== Baker Street and Waterloo Railway ===
For the BS&WR, 108 cars were built by the American Car and Foundry Company in the United States, and assembled at premises in Trafford Park, Manchester. There were 36 each of driving motors, driving trailers, and trailers.

=== Charing Cross, Euston and Hampstead Railway ===
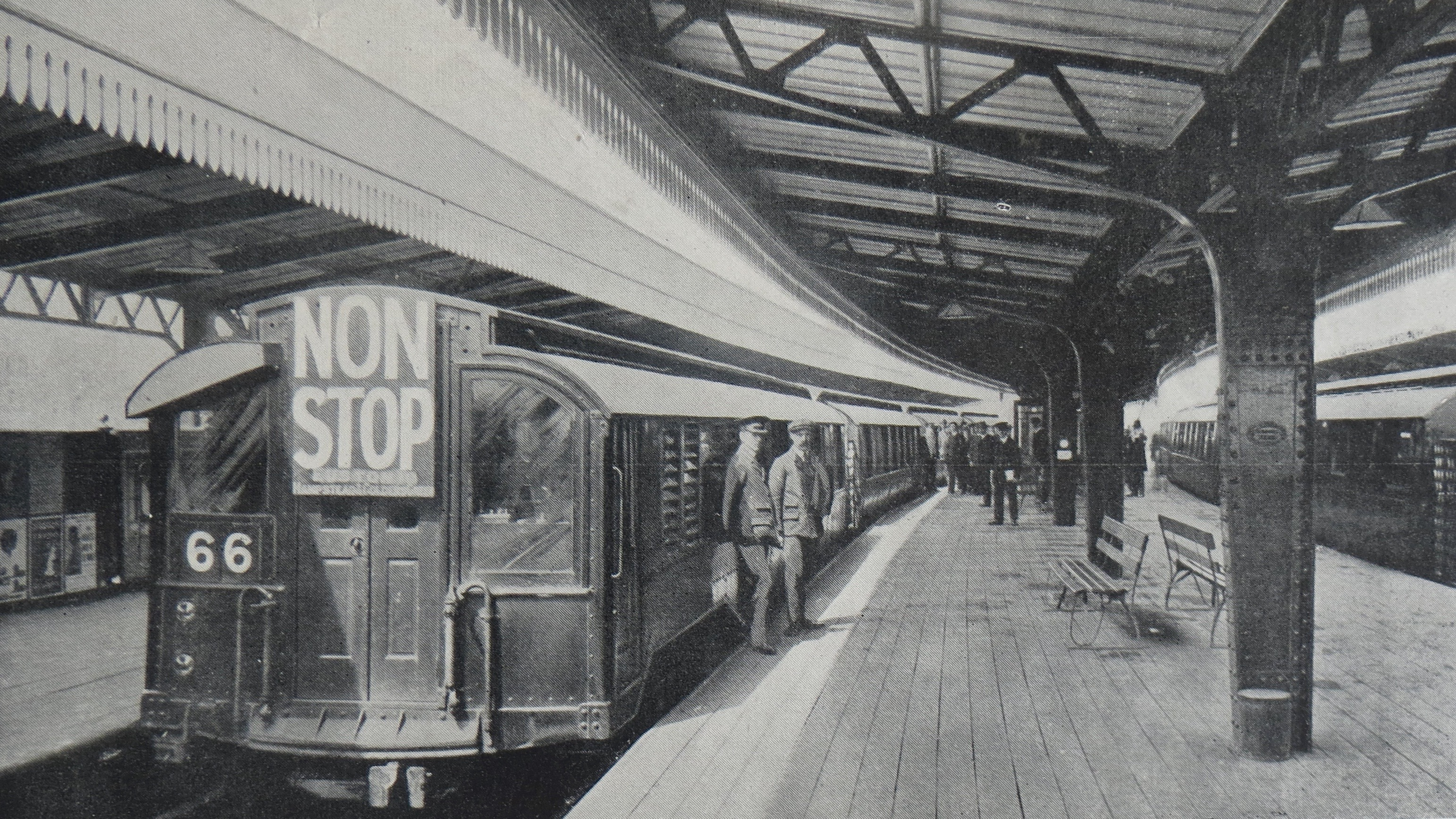
1906 stock at Golders Green station on 13 November 1911, the start of "non-stop" service. 8 morning, 9 evening and 2 "theatre" trains ran without stopping between Hampstead and Euston. The last non-stop trains ran in 1924.

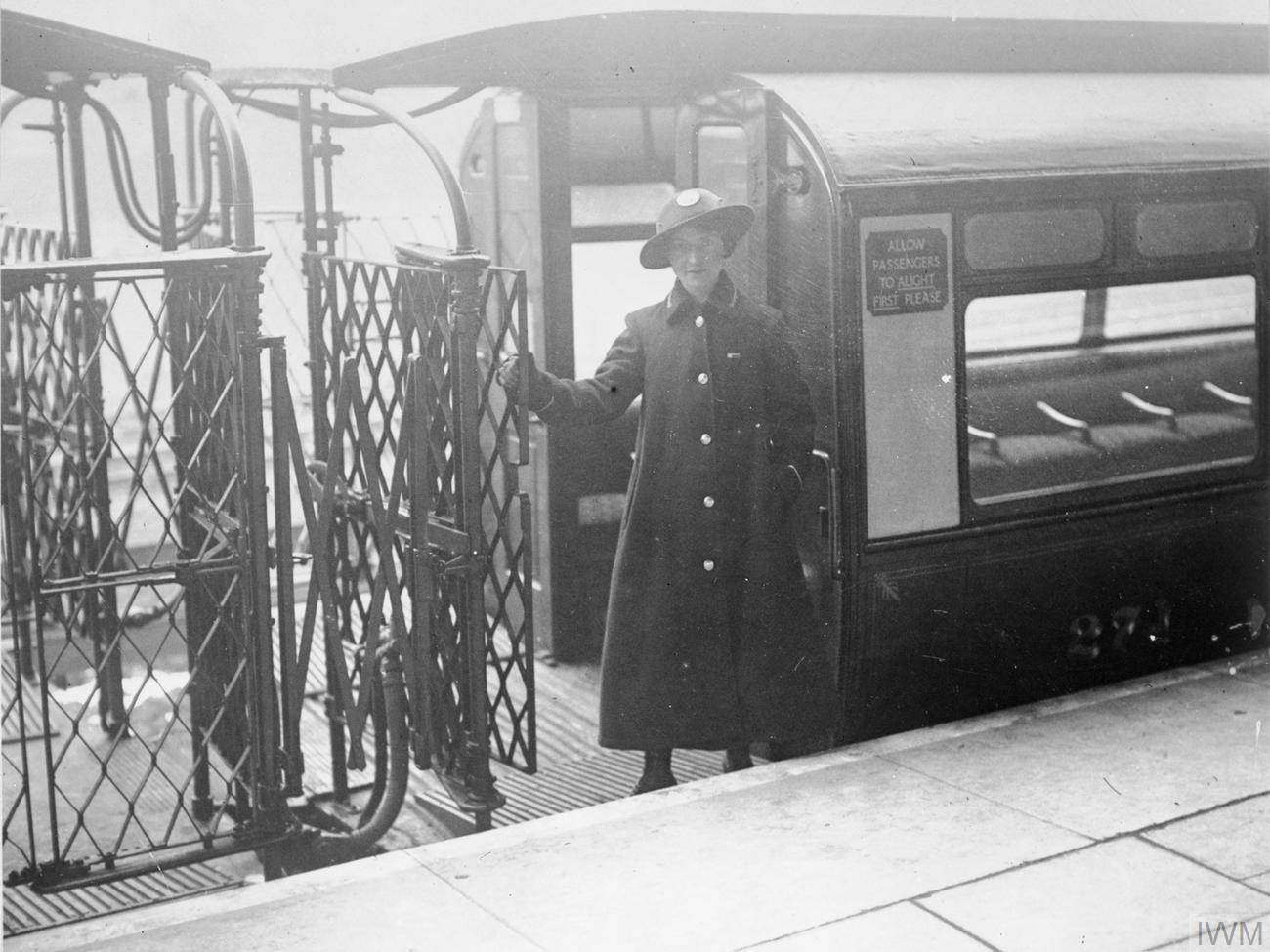
A train guard at work during World War I

For the CCE&HR, 150 cars were built, also by American Car and Foundry. Sixty were driving motors, fifty were driving trailers, and forty were trailers.

=== Great Northern, Piccadilly and Brompton Railway ===
For the GNP&BR, 218 cars (seventy-two motor cars and 146 trailers) were built, the order being split between Les Ateliers de Construction du Nord de la France, at Blanc-Misseron, France and Hungarian Railway Carriage and Machinery Works, in Győr, Hungary. Two cars were also built in Britain, one by the Metropolitan Carriage and Wagon Co and one by Brush Electrical Engineering Co Ltd. The cars, built in both France and Hungary, were shipped unfinished to England where they went to Lillie Bridge depot where they were prepared for service. Seating on the GN&PBR cars was forty-two in the motor cars and fifty-two in the trailers, the seats were rattan-covered. Livery was Midland lake.

== Conversion to air-operated doors ==
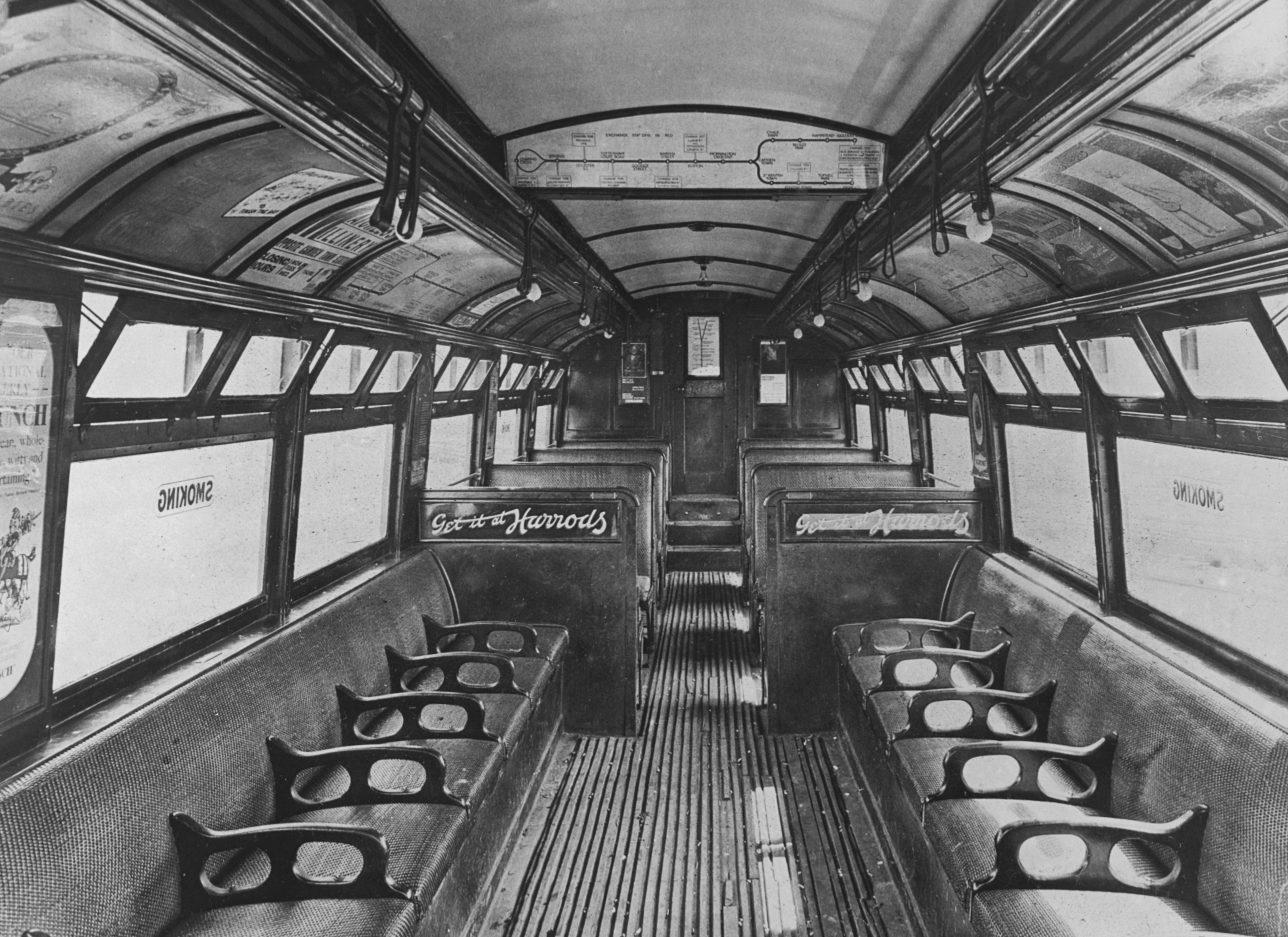
Interior of a 1906 Stock smoking saloon on the Charing Cross, Euston and Hampstead Railway

Only twenty cars, all driving motors, were converted for air-operated doors. These were all French-built cars and were converted in 1920 for use with the 1920 Stock. These lasted until 1930 when they were replaced by "Standard Stock" driving motors.

A few of these cars were used as ballast motors while two were rebuilt into double ended cars and used on the Aldwych branch until the 1950s.

Although it was not the only stock to have gates, the 1906 Stock seemed to be the only one that earned the nickname "Gate Stock". Entry and exit was by the end platforms, being protected by lattice gates, and operated by gate-men stationed between cars. The gate-men opened and shut the gates as well as passing the signal to start from car to car until the driver received it.

One anomaly remained until the 1980s as a reminder of the original "Gate Stock". This was the "Gateman's Allowance" paid under a 1927 agreement to the guards until around 1985, to compensate for the guard now having to operate all the doors on the train.

== Preservation ==
Part of one carriage of the stock has been preserved by the London Transport Museum's Acton depot.
