= Turweston =

Village in Buckinghamshire, England

Coordinates: 52.0347°N 1.1246°W

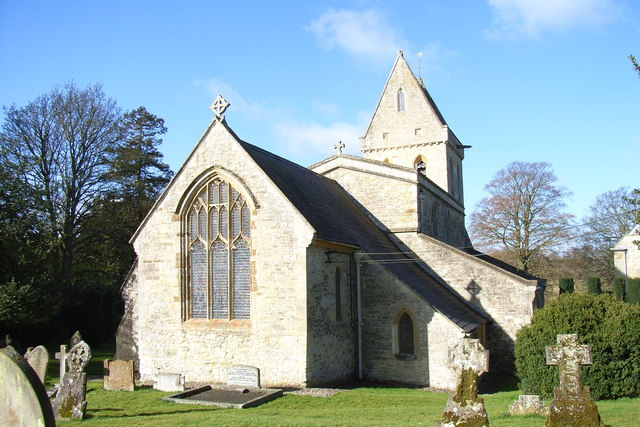
- St Mary's parish church

- Location within Buckinghamshire
- Population: 211 (2011)
- OS grid reference: SP6037
- Civil parish: Turweston
- Unitary authority: Buckinghamshire
- Ceremonial county: Buckinghamshire
- Region: South East
- Country: England
- Sovereign state: United Kingdom
- Post town: BRACKLEY
- Postcode district: NN13
- Dialling code: 01280
- Police: Thames Valley
- Fire: Buckinghamshire
- Ambulance: South Central
- UK Parliament: Buckingham and Bletchley

Turweston is a village and civil parish in north-west Buckinghamshire, England. The village is beside the River Great Ouse, which bounds the parish to the north, west and south. Turweston is the most northwesterly parish in Buckinghamshire: the Ouse here forms the county boundary with Northamptonshire to the north and west and Oxfordshire to the south. Across the river, the Northamptonshire market town of Brackley is just west of Turweston, with the town centre about 1 mile (1.6 km) west of the village. The parish has an area of 1,295 acres (524 ha) and had a population of 211 at the 2011 census.

== Toponym ==
Turweston's toponym is derived from the Old English for "Þorfrøthr's village". The name reached its present form through Turvestone in the Domesday Book of 1086; Thurneston and Turnestone in the 14th century; Turston, Tereweston, Turveston and Tower Weston in the 17th century and Turson in the 18th century.

== Manor ==
In the 11th century in the reign of Edward the Confessor Wenesi, the king's chamberlain, held a manor of five hides at Turweston. After the Norman Conquest of England he was dispossessed and the Domesday Book records that Turweston was held by a Norman, William de Fougères. By 1278 the overlordship had passed to Edmund Mortimer, 2nd Baron Mortimer, and it descended with his heirs the Earls of March until the 15th century. The Mortimers' mesne lords of Turweston were the Barons Zouche. The lesser lords of Turweston were the Scovill family until the 1280s, when the estate was escheated to the Crown. In 1292 Edward I bestowed the manor on Westminster Abbey. The Abbey retained Turweston after the dissolution of the monasteries in the 1530s, and still held the manor in the 1920s.

Turweston manor house is in the main street. It was built in 1630 and enlarged in 1910. Many of its rooms and passages have 17th-century oak panelling, there are three 17th-century fireplaces and a late 17th-century staircase with carved balusters.

Turweston House is an early 18th-century Georgian country house overlooking the parish church. It is of seven bays, with a three-bay pediment at the centre. It is a Grade II* listed building.

== Church and chapel ==
=== Church of England ===
The oldest parts of the Church of England parish church of the Assumption of the blesséd Virgin Mary are Norman. The nave was built first, and the north aisle and its two-bay arcade were added in about 1190. One Norman window survives in the west wall of the north aisle.

In the middle of the 13th century the chancel was rebuilt with Early English Gothic lancet windows and piscina. Two of these lancets survive; one each in the south and north walls. The south aisle was added at the same time, and its surviving Early English details are a piscina and a lancet west window. The south aisle's two-bay arcade was originally in the Transitional style between Norman and Early English. Only its east arch survives in this form, as in about 1360 its west arch was rebuilt. At the same time both aisles were widened, which is why the west window of the south aisle is now off-centre. In the 14th century in the chancel the lancet window on the south side was extended downwards to form a sedile and an ogeed and crocketted tomb recess was inserted in the north wall. The chancel east window is Perpendicular Gothic. The nave has a clerestory whose roof timbers are early 16th-century. Its tie-beams are moulded and have spandrels with cinquefoil tracery. The second stage of the west tower has a plain two-light window that is also 16th-century.

In 1863 the church was restored under the direction of the Oxford Diocesan Architect, G.E. Street. Street had the gable-roofed west tower rebuilt and a south porch added. He added a vestry and organ-chamber adjoining the north side of the chancel and east end of the north aisle. He also added a south chapel, inserting an arch between the chapel and south aisle and a two-bay arcade between the chapel and the chancel. Street re-used the windows that were removed from where the new arches were inserted: re-using and restoring the 14th-century east window from the south aisle as the east window of the chapel, and re-using the two windows from the south wall of the chancel as the chapel's two south windows.

In the chancel are two monumental brasses. On the north side is an early 15th-century 2-foot (0.6 m) brass of a priest wearing his Mass vestments. On the south side are late 15th-century 9-inch (230 mm) brass figures of Thomas Grene in civilian dress with his first and second wives, Joan and Agnes. The church has three 17th-century wall-mounted stone monuments. The most notable is a Jacobean one on the east wall of the north aisle, which has kneeling effigies of Simon Heynes (died 1628) and his wife with their baby, framed by Corinthian columns.

The stained glass in the east window of the south chapel was made by Thomas Willement in 1851. That in the east window of the chancel was made by Michael O'Connor in 1870.

The west tower has two early 17th-century bells, both cast by Robert Atton of Buckingham. The tenor was cast in 1625 and the treble in 1626. In 1913 the treble was reported to be "badly cracked".

The church is a Grade II* listed building.

The advowson has been attached to the manor since at least the 13th century. Westminster Abbey has held the advowson since Edward I bestowed the manor upon the Abbey in 1292.

The parish of the Assumption is part of the Benefice of West Buckingham, along with the parishes of Biddlesden, Shalstone, Tingewick, Water Stratford and Westbury.

=== Methodist ===
A Wesleyan chapel was built in Turweston in 1861. The building is no longer used for worship and is now the Scout headquarters.

== Economic and social history ==
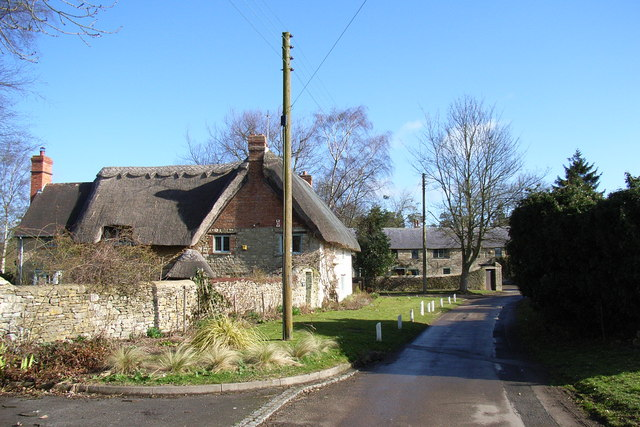
Thatched Rose Cottage (left) is 17th- or 18th-century.

Turweston has numerous stone cottages: several are 17th- or 18th-century; some are thatched. Manor Cottages were built in 1638 and altered in 1873. One late 17th-century cottage used to be the post office but has now reverted to a private home. The village had a school: it too was in a converted house and has now been converted back to a private home.

Turweston Inclosure Act 1813
- Act of Parliament
- Parliament of the United Kingdom
- Long title: An Act for inclosing Lands in the Manor and Parish of Turweston, in the County of Buckingham.
- Citation: 53 Geo. 3. c. cxliv

Dates
- Royal assent: 3 June 1813

Text of statute as originally enacted

The village has two stone barns: one 18th-century and the other either 18th- or 17th-century. Parliament passed the Turweston Inclosure Act 1813 (53 Geo. 3. c. cxliv) and the land award was made in 1814.

=== Public house ===
The Stratton Arms was built early in the 18th century and is named after a family that leased the manor from the mid-19th century until at least the 1920s.

=== Railways ===
In the late 1840s the Buckinghamshire Railway's line between Verney Junction and Banbury Merton Street was built along part of the Ouse valley through the southwest of the parish, passing about 1 mile (1.6 km) south of the village. It opened in May 1850, with its nearest station being at Brackley 2 1/4 miles (3.6 km) from Turweston.

In the late 1890s the Great Central Main Line from Manchester and Sheffield to London Marylebone was also built through the southwest of the parish, passing about 1/2-mile (800 m) west of the village. It opened in March 1899 with its nearest station about 3/5-mile (1 km) away at Brackley Central.

British Railways renamed the Buckinghamshire Railway station Brackley Town in 1951 and closed it in 1961. BR closed the Buckinghamshire Railway line in 1963 and the GC Main Line in 1966. The village lies close to the path of High Speed 2. Much of Turweston lies within 300 yards (275 metres) of the railway's path and this has brought property blight to the village and surrounding area. This issue was featured in an episode of the BBC consumer programme "Rip Off Britain" in October 2014, and a zero value rating placed upon the Old Post Office in Turweston, a Grade II listed building. This decision was later revised.

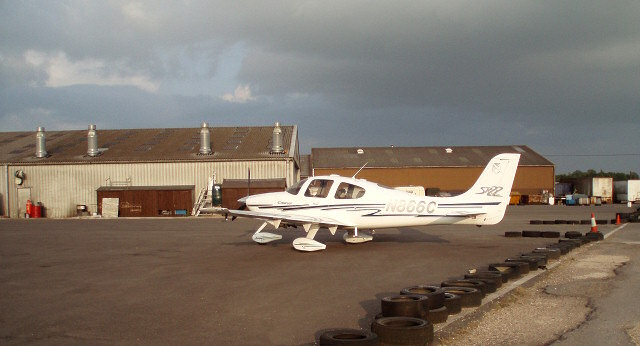
Cirrus SR22 light aircraft and buildings on the airfield

=== Airfield ===
East of the village is Turweston Airfield, which spans the parish's eastern boundary with Biddlesden. The airfield opened in 1942 as an RAF Bomber Command Operational Training Unit. It is now a civilian airfield, conference centre, business park and rally school.

== Sources ==
- Page, W.H., ed. (1927). "Turweston". A History of the County of Buckingham. Victoria County History. Vol. 4. pp. 251–254.
- Pevsner, Nikolaus (1960). Buckinghamshire. The Buildings of England. Harmondsworth: Penguin Books. pp. 269–270. ISBN 0-14-071019-1.
- RCHME, ed. (1913). "Turweston". An Inventory of the Historical Monuments in the County of Buckinghamshire. Vol. 2 – North. London: Royal Commission on the Historical Monuments of England. pp. 301–302.
