= Padbury railway station =

Former railway station in Buckinghamshire, England

Coordinates: 51.9671°N 0.9624°W

Padbury
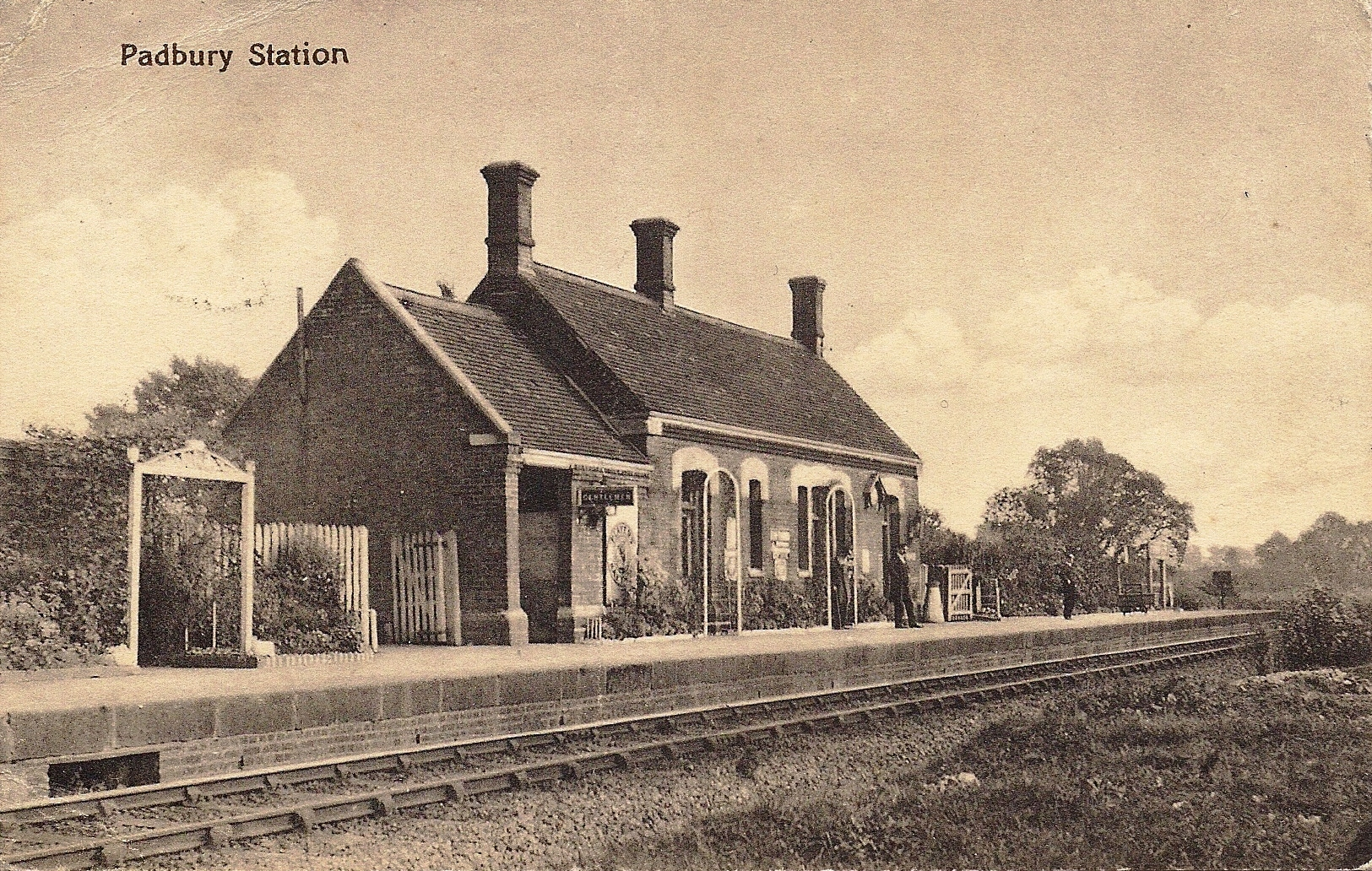

General information
- Location: Padbury, Buckinghamshire; England
- Grid reference: SP713305
- Platforms: 1

Other information
- Status: Disused

History
- Original company: Buckinghamshire Railway
- Pre-grouping: London and North Western Railway
- Post-grouping: London, Midland and Scottish Railway; London Midland Region of British Railways

Key dates
- 1 March 1878: Opened
- 6 January 1964: Goods facilities withdrawn
- 7 September 1964: Closed
Location

Padbury railway station served the village of Padbury in the English county of Buckinghamshire. It opened in 1878 as part of the Buckinghamshire Railway's branch line to Verney Junction which provided connections to Banbury, Bletchley and Oxford and closed in 1964.

== History ==
The Buckinghamshire Railway's line from Banbury to Verney Junction opened to passengers on 1 May 1850. It had been originally planned to provide a station to serve the Buckinghamshire village of Padbury at a projected cost of £3,000 (equivalent to £270,000 in 2025) but this did not materialise, possibly as a result of necessary economies. It was not until 1 March 1878 that a station was opened at Padbury. The London and North Western Railway, which had worked the line from its opening and which absorbed the Buckinghamshire Railway in 1879, advised the Board of Trade in January 1878 that a station was being built at Padbury and that a siding had been laid to facilitate construction. The points to the siding were locked and an Annett's key was held by the Verney Junction stationmaster from whom it had to be collected and returned after each working to the siding.

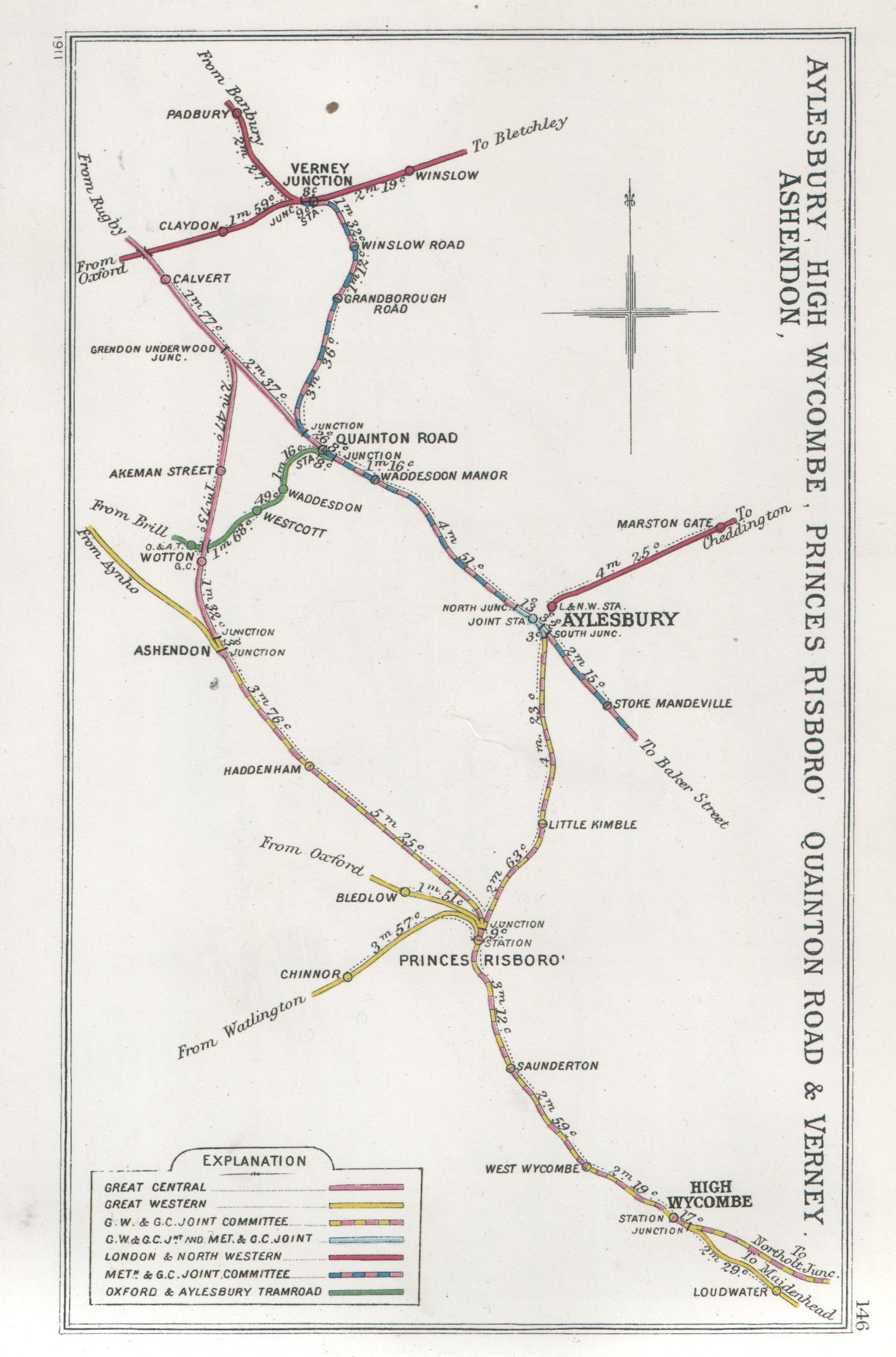
A 1911 Railway Clearing House map of railways in the vicinity of Padbury

A simple single storey red brick station building with a gable roof was provided at Padbury. No provision was made for the stationmaster who was expected to live in one of the nearby houses, as was the case for the Banbury Merton Street's stationmaster. As with Farthinghoe railway station, the station had a single platform, 250 ft (76 m) long, but unlike Farthinghoe it was conveniently situated to the west of the village of 650 inhabitants that it served. The station's siding ran in to the station forecourt to a point adjacent to the main station building; nearby were a cattle landing, weighbridge and hut. The siding, which was controlled by a six-lever ground frame and was released by an electric token, accommodated four or five coal wagons a week, together with milk traffic for the United Dairies factory in Buckingham and the village's requirements.

Padbury ceased to have its own stationmaster in 1928 upon the retirement of Levi Ambler. The station then came under the control of the stationmaster at Buckingham railway station who gave instructions to the remaining staff consisting of a single porter and junior assistant. From 1942 the station's staff consisted of a single lady porter, Bertha Allen, who was employed by the London, Midland and Scottish Railway (LMS) as temporary wartime cover, but instead remained for a further twenty-four years until the station's closure. In 1961, the section of the line between Banbury and Buckingham was closed. On the remaining section Padbury station was listed for closure by the Beeching report and it duly closed to goods traffic on 6 January 1964 and to passenger traffic on 7 September 1964. The track was however not removed immediately and Padbury was thus able to accommodate the Royal Train for an overnight stay on 3/4 April 1966 for a visit by the Queen and the Duke of Edinburgh to Buckingham.

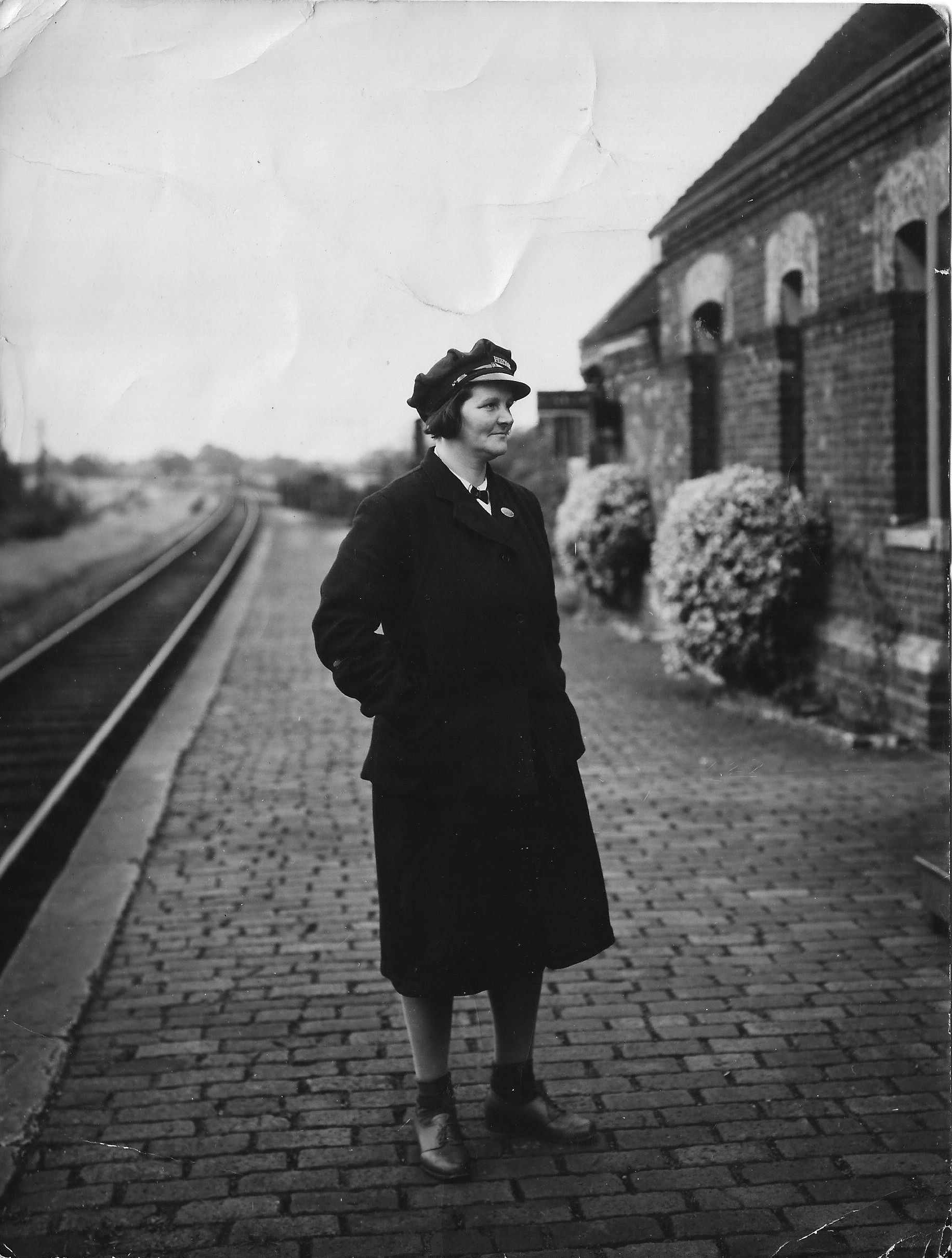
Bertha Allen, station mistress at Padbury Railway Station from 1942 until the station closed in 1966

Preceding station	Disused railways	Following station
Buckingham	London and North Western Railway; Banbury to Verney Junction Branch Line	Verney Junction

== Present day ==
The station buildings were demolished in 1968 and the site was cleared. By 1975, construction of a small housing estate had commenced which now occupies the site. Just south of Padbury station a skew bridge took the line over Main Street which led into the village has been removed leaving no trace. The course of the line to the south of the station followed a shallow cutting which is now infilled and returned to agriculture.
