= Greatworth =

Village in Northamptonshire, England

Coordinates: 52.09°N 1.19°W

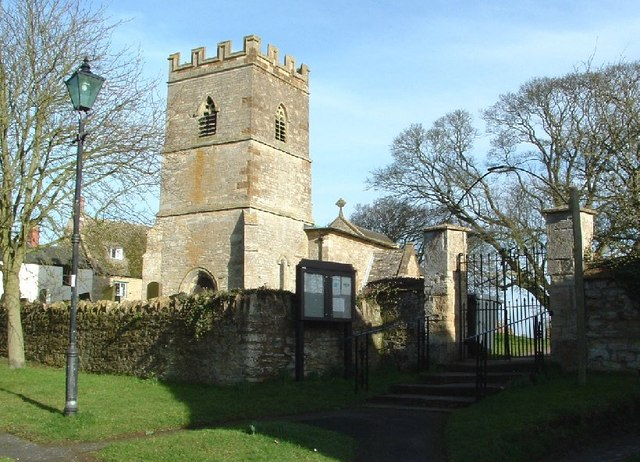
- St Peter's parish church

- Location within Northamptonshire
- Population: 890 (2011 Census)
- OS grid reference: SP5542
  - London: 72 miles (116 km)
- Civil parish: Greatworth and Halse
- Unitary authority: West Northamptonshire
- Ceremonial county: Northamptonshire
- Region: East Midlands
- Country: England
- Sovereign state: United Kingdom
- Post town: Banbury
- Postcode district: OX17
- Dialling code: 01295
- Police: Northamptonshire
- Fire: Northamptonshire
- Ambulance: East Midlands
- UK Parliament: South Northamptonshire
- Website: Greatworth Parish Council

Greatworth is a village in the civil parish of Greatworth and Halse about 4 miles (6.4 km) north-west of Brackley, West Northamptonshire, England. The parish also includes the hamlet of Halse. In 2011, the settlement had a population of 708. The 2011 Census recorded the parish population as 890.

== History ==
The villages name means 'Gravelly enclosure'.

The parish includes the deserted medieval village of Stuchbury, about 2 1/4 miles (3.6 km) northeast of Greatworth village. Halse, about 2 1/2 miles (4 km) southeast of Greatworth village, is also the site of a deserted medieval village as well as a modern hamlet.

Greatworth Manor House burned down in 1793, and only its ornate gatepiers remain.

On 1 April 2019 the parish was renamed from "Greatworth" to "Greatworth & Halse".

== Parish church ==
The Church of England parish church of Saint Peter was built in the 13th century. The chancel retains Early English features including a priests' door and two lancet windows in the south wall and a trio of stepped lancets in the east wall. The west tower was added in about 1300. The nave has 17th-century features including two north windows, two south windows and the south door, and the polygonal pulpit. The chancel arch was rebuilt in 1882 under the direction of the architect H. R. Gough. It is a Grade II* listed building.

The west tower has a ring of six bells. A member of the Newcombe family, who were associated with bell-foundries in Bedford, Buckingham and Leicester, cast the tenor bell in about 1599. The fifth bell was also cast in about 1599 but the identity of the founder is unknown. Robert Taylor, who had foundries at Loughborough and Oxford, cast the fourth bell in 1825. The Whitechapel Bell Foundry cast the treble, second and third bells in 2004.

St Peter's churchyard has a notable array of historic headstones. 20 of them in are Grade II listed, and two late 17th-century English Baroque headstones are Grade II* listed.

St Peter's parish is a member of the Chenderit Benefice, which includes the parishes of Chacombe, Marston St. Lawrence, Middleton Cheney, Thenford and Warkworth.

== Railways ==
In 1847, Parliament passed a bill for the Buckinghamshire Railway to build a branch through Buckingham to Banbury. It was built through the south of Greatworth parish and opened in 1851. The nearest station was Farthinghoe, which was not at Farthinghoe but 2 miles (3 km) southwest of Greatworth on the main road between Brackley and Middleton Cheney.

The Northampton & Banbury Junction Railway was incorporated in 1863 and built through the parish, joining the Buckinghamshire Railway at Cockley Brake Junction 0.5 miles (800 m) south of the village. It opened in 1872 and became part of the Stratford on Avon and Midland Junction Railway in 1910. In 1951 British Railways closed the Northampton line to all traffic and the Banbury line to passenger traffic. BR closed the Banbury line to freight traffic in 1963.

== RAF Greatworth ==
In 1949, the Air Ministry bought land from Balliol College, Oxford to create RAF Greatworth, which was an RAF radio communications station from early in the 1950s until 1988. In 1973, the station had a selection of high frequency (HF) radio transmitters, including the Marconi HS31 (6 kW), HS51 (30 kW), HS71 (12 kW) and the Marconi MST (Marconi Self Tuner) 1200 (30 kW). There was also a selection of Racal Speedrace transmitters, one of which offered remote control of frequency and aerial parameters from Systems Control. The aerial farm had steerable log periodic antennae, dipoles, rhombics and bicones – all types of HF antenna. A 24-hour watch system, each consisting of an RAF sergeant, a junior technician (JT), a senior aircraftman (SAC) and a civilian radio technician was maintained which carried out preventive and corrective maintenance and also re-tuned the transmitters and their drive units as directed by Systems Control at RAF Stanbridge in Bedfordshire.

After closure the site was leased to the USAF until it was handed back to the Ministry of Defence in February 1992. The site is now Greatworth Park trading estate, for which the original RAF buildings have been retained and extended.

== Amenities ==
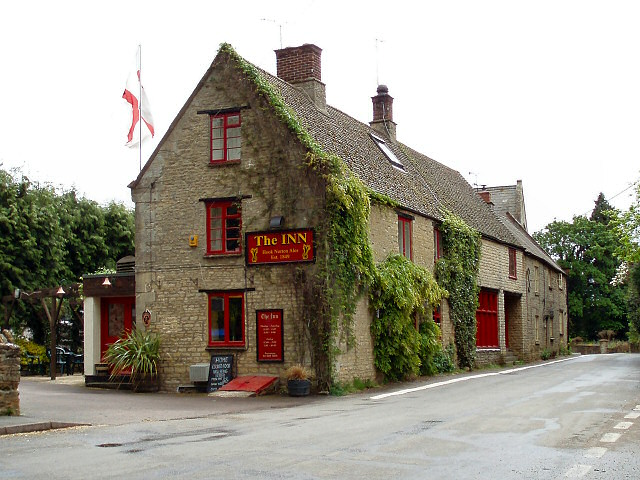
The Inn, Greatworth

Greatworth has one public house, The Greatworth Inn, which is an independent freehold.

Greatworth has a post office, corner shop, a social club and a primary school.

== Sources ==
- Pevsner, Nikolaus; Cherry, Bridget (1973) [1961]. Northamptonshire. The Buildings of England. Harmondsworth: Penguin Books. p. 239. ISBN 0-14-071022-1.
- RCHME, ed. (1982). An Inventory of the Historical Monuments in the County of Northamptonshire. Vol. 4, Archaeological Sites in South-West Northamptonshire. London: Her Majesty's Stationery Office. pp. 64–70.
