= Middleton Cheney =

Village in Northamptonshire, England

Coordinates: 52°04′26″N 1°16′23″W

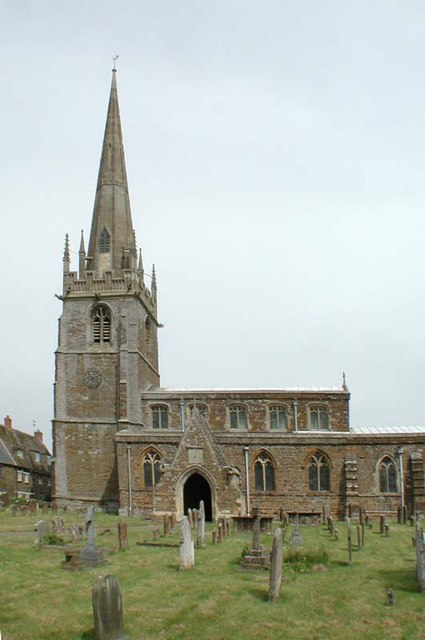
- All Saints' parish church

- Location within Northamptonshire
- Population: 3,597 (2011 Census)
- OS grid reference: SP5041
  - London: 72 miles (116 km)
- Civil parish: Middleton Cheney
- Unitary authority: West Northamptonshire
- Ceremonial county: Northamptonshire
- Region: East Midlands
- Country: England
- Sovereign state: United Kingdom
- Post town: Banbury
- Postcode district: OX17
- Dialling code: 01295
- Police: Northamptonshire
- Fire: Northamptonshire
- Ambulance: East Midlands
- UK Parliament: South Northamptonshire
- Website: Middleton Cheney village website

Middleton Cheney is a large village and civil parish in West Northamptonshire, England. The village is about 3 miles (5 km) east of Banbury in Oxfordshire and about 6 miles (10 km) west-northwest of Brackley. The A422 road between Banbury and Brackley used to pass through Middleton Cheney, but now bypasses it to the south.

The 2011 Census recorded the parish's population (including Thenford) as 3,597.

== Archaeology and history ==
The village's name means "middle farm" or "middle settlement". John de Chendut held the manor in the 12th century.

Middleton Cheney Inclosure Act 1769
- Act of Parliament
- Parliament of Great Britain
- Long title: An Act for dividing and enclosing a certain Open and Common Field, and Commonable Lands, in the Townships and Liberties of Upper Middleton Cheney and Lower Middleton Cheney, in the County of Northampton.
- Citation: 9 Geo. 3. c. 102 Pr.
- Territorial extent: Great Britain

Dates
- Royal assent: 1 May 1769
- Commencement: 8 November 1768 (Note: Start of session.)

Status: Current legislation

Traces of Neolithic, Bronze Age and Roman settlements have been found in the parish. An open field system of farming prevailed in the parish until the 18th century. Parliament passed the Middleton Cheney Inclosure Act 1769 (9 Geo. 3. c. 102 Pr.) and the parish was surveyed for its inclosure awards in 1770. There is a row of 19th-century almshouses on the former main road through the village.

In 1847 Parliament passed the Buckinghamshire Railway Act 1847 (10 & 11 Vict. c. ccxxxvi) for the Buckinghamshire Railway to build an extension to Banbury. It was built through the south of Middleton Cheney parish, and Farthinghoe railway station was opened in the parish in 1851. It was in the southeast corner of the parish, 1 3/4 miles (2.8 km) from the village, on the main road to Brackley. British Railways closed the station in 1952 and the railway in 1963.

The Holt was a house in the parish designed by William Wilkinson. It built in 1864 and demolished in 1973.

The parish used to include the village of Overthorpe, which is now a separate parish.

== Churches ==
=== Church of England ===
The Church of England parish church of All Saints is early 14th-century Decorated Gothic. The windows have been renewed but the south doorway is original. The nave has a clerestory, north and south aisles and four-bay arcades.

The west tower and spire are later Medieval Perpendicular Gothic additions. The top of the spire is about 150 feet (46 m) above ground. In the 18th century the spire survived three lightning strikes: in 1720, 1794 and 1797.

All Saints was restored under the direction of George Gilbert Scott in 1865. During the restoration notable stained-glass windows were added that were designed by the Pre-Raphaelite artists William Morris, Philip Webb, Edward Burne-Jones, Ford Madox Brown and Simeon Solomon and made by Morris & Co. There are also mosaics made by James Powell and Sons, one of which was designed by Henry Holiday.

The Church of England parish church of All Saints is early 14th-century Decorated Gothic. The windows have been renewed but the south doorway is original. The nave has a clerestory, north and south aisles and four-bay arcades. William Edington was Rector 1322–35. He was consecrated Bishop of Winchester in 1345.

The west tower and spire are later Medieval Perpendicular Gothic additions. The top of the spire is about 150 feet (46 m) above ground. In the 18th century the spire survived three lightning strikes: in 1720, 1794 and 1797.

All Saints was restored under the direction of George Gilbert Scott in 1865. During the restoration notable stained-glass windows were added that were designed by the Pre-Raphaelite artists William Morris, Philip Webb, Edward Burne-Jones, Ford Madox Brown and Simeon Solomon and made by Morris & Co. There are also mosaics made by James Powell and Sons, one of which was designed by Henry Holiday.

All Saints is now a Grade I listed building.

The west tower has a ring of six bells. Henry I Bagley of Chacombe cast four of them: the tenor in 1640, the second bell in 1659, the treble in 1671 and the third bell in 1680. James Keene, who had bell-foundries at Bedford and Woodstock, cast the fifth bell in 1651. Mears and Stainbank of the Whitechapel Bell Foundry cast the fourth bell in 1881.

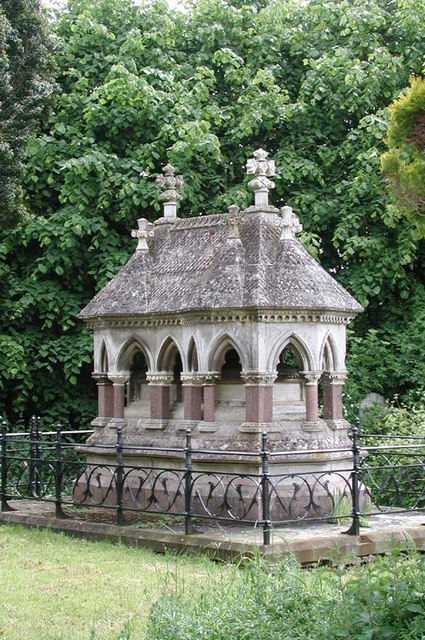
Horton family mausoleum, designed by William Wilkinson and made by Thomas Earp in 1866–67

All Saints' churchyard has a number of historic grave monuments. Four 17th-century English Baroque headstones and two 18th-century chest tombs are Grade II listed. The Horton family mausoleum is not listed, but is a Gothic Revival monument designed by William Wilkinson and made by Thomas Earp in 1866–67.

All Saints is a member of the Chenderit Benefice, which includes the parishes of Chacombe, Greatworth, Marston St. Lawrence, Thenford and Warkworth.

=== Baptist ===
The Baptist congregation in Middleton Cheney may have been formed in 1740. The site of its original chapel is not known, but may have been in the Baptist burial ground in Queen Street. The present Baptist Centre was built as a chapel in 1806.

=== Methodist ===
A Methodist congregation was meeting in Middleton Cheney by 1802 and had a registered chapel by 1814. The present Methodist Church was built as a Wesleyan chapel in 1867. It is a member of the Banbury Circuit.

== Local amenities ==
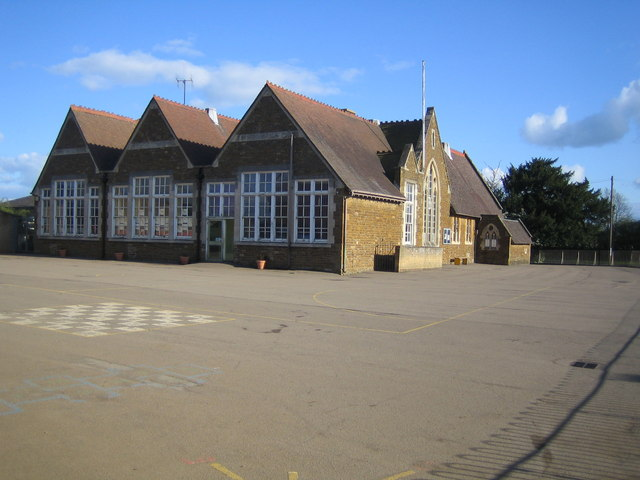
Middleton Cheney Primary Academy

Middleton Cheney has a village hall, a set of parish meeting rooms, a public library, sub-post office, two veterinary surgeries, a pharmacy, supermarket and a cookery school. The village has two 18th-century pubs: The Dolphin Inn and The New Inn, plus a sports and social club.

Middleton has a pre-school as well as Middleton Cheney Primary Academy, a primary school for children between the ages of 4 and 11. Chenderit School is a secondary school that includes a sixth form.

Middleton Cheney has a set of playing fields. The village has clubs for cricket, football, karate and tennis. The football club's home ground is in Astrop Road and the first team play in the Oxfordshire Senior Football League. It has a junior section that plays in the Witney and District Youth Football League.

The Middleton Music Festival used to be an annual event, usually held in about the second weekend in July, but this has now ceased, the last being held in 2011.

== Vice-Admiral Holland ==
Vice Admiral Lancelot Holland (1887–1941) was born in Middleton Cheney. He joined the Royal Navy in 1902 and spent the First World War as a gunnery instructor at HMS Excellent. By 1934 he was a rear admiral, and in 1937 he was aide-de-camp to King George VI.

In the Second World War, Holland commanded the 7th Cruiser Squadron at the Battle of Cape Spartivento in November 1940. In May 1941 he commanded the Battlecruiser Squadron when it engaged the German battleship Bismarck in the Battle of Denmark Strait. The magazine of Holland's flagship HMS Hood exploded, breaking her in two and sinking her. Holland was killed, along with all but three of Hood's company.

The Admiral Holland pub in Bretch Hill, Banbury, was named after him. The pub was demolished in 2017.

== Sources ==
- Lewis, Samuel, ed. (1931) [1848]. A Topographical Dictionary of England (Seventh ed.). London: Samuel Lewis. pp. 306–310.
- Pevsner, Nikolaus; Cherry, Bridget (revision) (1973) [1961]. Northamptonshire. The Buildings of England (2nd ed.). Harmondsworth: Penguin Books. pp. 304–306. ISBN 0-14-071022-1.
- RCHME, ed. (1982). An Inventory of the Historical Monuments in the County of Northamptonshire. Vol. 4, Archaeological Sites in South-West Northamptonshire. London: Her Majesty's Stationery Office. pp. 101–102.
