= Water Stratford Halt railway station =

Former railway station in Buckinghamshire, England

Coordinates: 52.0021°N 1.0525°W

Water Stratford Halt

General information
- Location: Water Stratford, Buckinghamshire; England
- Grid reference: SP653342
- Platforms: 1

Other information
- Status: Disused

History
- Original company: London Midland Region of British Railways

Key dates
- 13 August 1956: Opened
- 2 January 1961: Closed
Location

Water Stratford Halt was a railway station on the Banbury to Verney Junction Branch Line which served the village of Water Stratford in Buckinghamshire, England, from 1956 to 1961.

== History ==
During the summer of 1956 the Banbury to Buckingham section of the Banbury to Verney Junction branch line was chosen as the location for a single railcar experiment to encourage greater passenger patronage on the branch which was suffering from low receipts in the face of competition from buses and motor cars. The experiment formed part of the 1955 Modernisation Plan. The units would run from Banbury to Buckingham where a connection would be made with the traditional steam push-pull service to Bletchley.

New halts were opened at Radclive and Water Stratford and a third was proposed on the edge of Buckingham but not provided. The two halts were constructed of timber with old sleepers forming the platform surface; unlike the other stations on the line, the halts were constructed to standard train height and one car in length. They were equipped with little other than a simple wooden painted nameboard and several old LNWR oil lamps; there was no shelter for passengers nor even a bench. The lamps were lit by the Brackley stationmaster.

The two British Rail Derby Lightweight railcars, nos. M79900 and M79901, resulted in a reported 400% increase in traffic and were well used especially on market days and Saturdays when both ran together, carrying up to 120 passengers. Despite the increased revenue and reduction in costs, the railcars were unable to save the Banbury - Buckingham section from closure on 2 January 1961, with British Rail claiming that although the cars were well used during peak times, they ran empty at normal times. According to published figures, the line had been losing £14,000 per annum before the experiment with receipts of around £50 per month; the railcars resulted in an increase in the income of around £250 - £300 per month, but still ran at a loss of £400 per month and the annual loss on the line could not be reduced beyond £4,700.

Preceding station	Disused railways	Following station
Fulwell & Westbury	London and North Western Railway; Banbury to Verney Junction Branch Line	Radclive Halt

== Present day ==
Although no trace remains of Water Stratford Halt, the trackbed through the station remains intact and a public footpath follows it for some distance.
