= Padbury =

Village in Buckinghamshire, England

Coordinates: 51.971°N 0.952°W

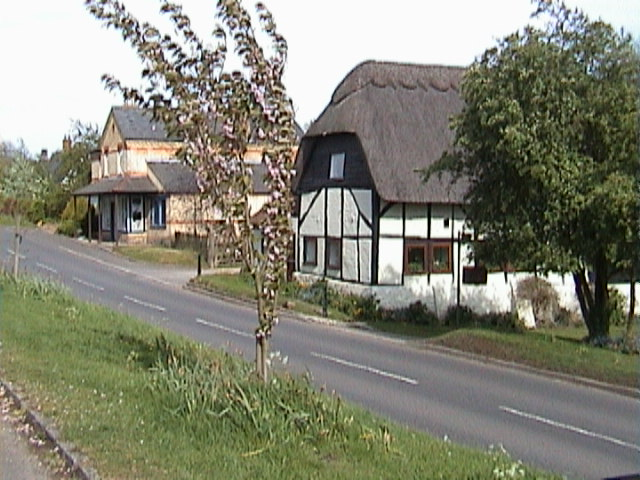
- Former tithe barn, now converted

- Location within Buckinghamshire
- Interactive map of Padbury
- Population: 810 (2011)
- OS grid reference: SP720308
  - London: 50 miles (80 km) SE
- Civil parish: Padbury
- Unitary authority: Buckinghamshire
- Ceremonial county: Buckinghamshire
- Region: South East
- Country: England
- Sovereign state: United Kingdom
- Post town: BUCKINGHAM
- Postcode district: MK18
- Dialling code: 01280
- Police: Thames Valley
- Fire: Buckinghamshire
- Ambulance: South Central
- UK Parliament: Buckingham and Bletchley

Padbury is a village and civil parish in north Buckinghamshire, England. It is located on the A413 main road that links Buckingham with Winslow.

Padbury is just under 50 miles (80 km) north of London and 9 miles (14 km) South West of central Milton Keynes.

== History ==
The village name is Old English in origin, and means 'Padda's fortress'. In the Domesday Book of 1086 the village was recorded as Pateberie. The Manor of Padbury was exchanged, around the time of the Norman Conquest, for the Manor of Iver between Robert Doyley and Robert Clarenbold of the Marsh.

The village had the distinction in Domesday as being one of the few villages in the country still owned by a native rather than a Norman family. It remained in this family (who later took the name 'de Wolverton' after the town of Wolverton) until 1442 when it was sold to All Souls College, Oxford.

During the English Civil War Padbury was the site of a skirmish between the Royalist and Parliamentarian forces. The Royalists won on this occasion, and the burial of eight Parliamentarian soldiers is recorded in the burial register for 2 July 2 1643.

In December 2014 a hoard of 5,251½ silver coins from the late Anglo Saxon period was found in a field at Lenborough near Padbury by an 8-year-old boy among others. It had originally been deposited within a lead container; the coins were sent to the British Museum for evaluation and conservation.

== Hospitality ==
The village features two pubs, 'The New Inn' and 'The Blackbird'.

== Facilities ==
The village has two tennis courts, a football pitch and a multi-use games area (MUGA).

== Education ==
Padbury Church of England School is a mixed Church of England primary school. It is a voluntary controlled school, which takes children from the age of four through to the age of eleven. The school has approximately 110 pupils. It has been ranked in the top 10 performing schools of over 220 primary schools in Buckinghamshire.

== Transport ==
The village had a railway station between 1878 and 1964, on the Banbury–Verney Junction branch line.
