= Buckingham railway station =

Former railway station in Buckingham, England

Coordinates: 51.99381°N 0.98919°W

Buckingham
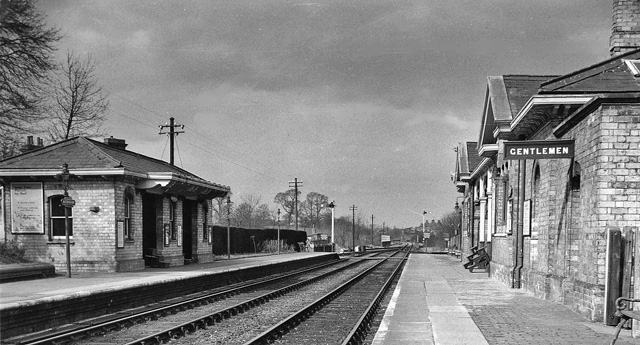
- The station in 1962

General information
- Location: Buckingham, Buckinghamshire; England
- Grid reference: SP695333
- Platforms: 2

Other information
- Status: Disused

History
- Original company: Buckinghamshire Railway
- Pre-grouping: London and North Western Railway
- Post-grouping: London, Midland and Scottish Railway; London Midland Region of British Railways

Key dates
- 1 May 1850: Opened
- 7 September 1964: Closed to passengers
- 5 December 1966: Closed to goods
Location

Buckingham was a railway station which served Buckingham, the former county town of Buckinghamshire, England, between 1850 and 1966.

== History ==
=== Opening ===
The first survey of the London and Birmingham Railway's main line to London plotted a course which ran through Buckingham where a large locomotive and carriage works would have been built. The route was however altered in the face of opposition from the Duke of Buckingham who feared for the future of the town, and the line took a new course through Wolverton, opening in 1838. It was to be a further twelve years before Buckingham was connected to the railway, this time on the initiative of the second Duke of Buckingham together with local landowner Sir Harry Verney who formed the Buckinghamshire Railway to construct a line between Banbury and Bletchley on a branch from Verney Junction.

After three years of construction, the single track line opened to passengers on 1 May 1850. The line was initially worked by the London and North Western Railway (LNWR) which laid on a service of four trains each way daily. At Buckingham, a temporary rudimentary wooden station fronting on to Lenborough Road was used which initially suffered from poor access, being situated almost in the middle of a field along a footpath. This was improved when, in 1853, the station was reached by Chandos Road. The area around Chandos Road became a centre of housing growth. The Buckingham Corporation petitioned the railway company to construct a better station which it eventually did in 1861. Designed by John William Livock, the new station was constructed in a doric style with cornice moulding and pediment. A new road named "Station Road" was laid from Chandos Road to connect with Gawcott Road to allow passengers to reach the new booking office.

=== Early years ===
A number of railway excursions were organised in the early years, taking passengers to destinations such as Crystal Palace via Euston. Initial regular services consisted of five daily trains each way on weekdays and one afternoon service on Sundays. Passengers could travel to London via Verney Junction and Bletchley in around 2.5 hours, the service then continuing on to Liverpool and Birmingham via Rugby. The completion of the new line south from Verney Junction to Aylesbury in 1868 opened up the possibility of further destinations.

In 1889 the Duke of Buckingham died leaving no male issue meaning that the Dukedom of Buckingham and Chandos became extinct. The family seat at Stowe House was subsequently let to the Comte de Paris, the royalist pretender to the French throne. His residence at Stowe House led the railway company to install bilingual signage at the station as an aid to his staff. In 1898, W H Smith installed a book stall on the platform, this was subsequently replaced by a Wyman's stall when a change in contract resulted in Smith's moving their business to the town centre.

Milk trade was becoming an important source of railway income at the turn of the twentieth century, so much so that a creamery and milk processing factory was constructed opposite the station to handle the milk train traffic. The factory's owners changed names several times, being variously known as the Anglo-Swiss Condensed Milk Co., the Condensed and Peptonised Milk Co., Thew, Hook and Gilbey and then later as United Dairies.

In 1915, the LNWR made a number of economies to the line, one of which included the closure of the small signal box in the goods yard, 750 yards to the north of the station. The double-track section between the station and signal box - the only doubled section on the line - was severed at the station and a buffer stop installed on the down line. The up and down lines were then reconnected by slewing a section of track across.

=== Decline and closure ===
Passenger traffic over the line was never particularly heavy, although it was a useful goods route. In the face of increased competition from buses and the private motor car in the 1920s and 1930s, passenger levels declined. By the late 1940s, Sunday passenger services were withdrawn and there were now only four services each way on weekdays. The line was also hit hard by the ASLEF strike of 1955 which saw much of the milk traffic lost to road. A form of reprieve came in 1956 when British Rail attempted to reduce losses by introducing lightweight single unit diesel cars (9 up and down daily) in 1956 between Banbury and Buckingham as part of the 1955 Modernisation Plan. Although this experiment was rewarded by an increase in traffic of over 400%, British Rail nevertheless claimed that the line was uneconomic. The section between Banbury and Buckingham closed on 2 January 1961, leaving Buckingham as the terminus for the branch passenger traffic.

Proposals to close the remainder of the line surfaced in September 1963 and a public hearing was held the following October. Passenger services were subsequently withdrawn as from 7 September 1964, leaving the line to Verney Junction open for freight. Woolworths opened a store in Buckingham in February 1964 and operated a policy of moving their goods by rail. The station's goods yard was soon full of vans carrying the company's merchandise. British Rail nonetheless announced the closure of the branch to Verney Junction as from 11 March 1966, with the line remaining open until 4 April for the purposes of a visit from the Queen. The station did eventually close in December 1966.

In its last full year of service, the line between Bletchley and Buckingham carried 6,600 passengers, with receipts of £4,000. This amount included 1,000 passengers travelling on Stowe School specials, who accounted for £1,250; the remaining 5,600 passengers brought in an income of £2,750, working out at two passengers per train. A Midland Red bus service provided a replacement service between local villages.

Preceding station	Disused railways	Following station
Radclive Halt	London and North Western Railway; Banbury to Verney Junction Branch Line	Padbury

== Present day ==
The station buildings have been completely demolished, leaving only the platform edges which remain in a dilapidated state. The trackbed through Buckingham, infilled to platform level, has become a wooded walk.
