= National Filling Factory, Banbury =

Coordinates: 52.060°N 1.307°W

National Filling Factory, Banbury, officially called National Filling Factory No. 9. was a British Ministry of Munitions filling factory, constructed during World War I and located in Banbury, Oxfordshire. The production of filled shells began in April 1916 and ended when the factory closed in 1924

== Background ==
At the outbreak of World War I, the production of explosives and the associated filling facilities for high explosives were limited to the Royal Arsenal at Woolwich, and the facilities of the Elswick Ordnance Company at Derwenthaugh and Lemington Point, both close to Newcastle Upon Tyne. The British Army found itself on the Western Front short of explosive shells and bullets. The Ministry of Munitions (MoM) under new minister David Lloyd George, were tasked to construct a suitable infrastructure of National Filling Factories (NFFs) to supply the Army.

== Principles of layout and operation ==
The MoM were looking to create a number of munitions production facilities quickly and cheaply. It acquired a series of large sites in semi-rural locations, ideally quite level, which were close to nearby railway lines for both transportation of product and workers. Although there was no standard design, the principles of layout (for safety and efficient, logical production), plus the dimensions and layout of associated buildings were laid down by the MoM, based on lessons from the Royal Arsenal.

Plan form of the final layout was greatly influenced by topography, and the locally contracted architect's ideas. Four explosives filling factories, including that at Banbury, were designed, built and managed by their Managing Directors. Construction of NFFs at Banbury and Perivale were undertaken by the Ministry of Works.

In operation the principles of scientific management were applied to the NFF workforce, particularly "dilution" where by complex skilled work was broken down into individual repetitive tasks, which could hence be performed by unskilled or semi-skilled labour. The result was that in many NFF's, the work force consisted of up to 90% women, who also as bonus had small hands to allow for easier filling of the shells. The workforces also often included children for the same reason, to allow for small and medium shell production.

== Construction ==
A site of 100 hectares (250 acres) was acquired by MoM in Summer 1915, located east of Banbury beyond the Bowling Green Inn on Grimsbury's Overthorpe Road. It had good connections with the former-London and North Western Railway Buckinghamshire Railway, which went eastward out of Banbury Merton Street railway station. NFF No.9. was commissioned in November 1915, under the construction management of Mr Herbert Bing of the MoW. The initial sub-contract was let in January 1916 to Messrs Willet of Sloane Square. Laid out to a standard design, the site encompassed:

- 27 miles (43 km) standard-gauge railway. This extended both sites of the site, allowing for separate transport of both bare shells, raw explosives and completed ammunitions
- 3 miles (4.8 km) of roads
- 9 miles (14 km) of guard fence
- 10 miles (16 km) of footpaths and sentry paths
- 370 buildings varying in floor area. Like a typical munitions facility, the buildings were widely spaced on safety reasons, to avoid complete destruction of the facility in case of an explosion
- The 11 central melting rooms where filling took place, the Picric acid stores, and the two storage magazines were surrounded by earthworks and blast walls.

Most buildings were timber-framed, set on brick foundations or latterly concrete slabs, and then weather-boarded or covered in uralite (brown asbestos sheeting). The larger storage buildings with roofs greater than 12 metres (39 ft) were brick-built, spanned by Belfast trusses.

== Operations ==
All components were produced elsewhere, mostly shipped in and out by rail, with the facility responsible for final production: inserting explosive into shells, and fitting detonators. Shell filling began on 25 April 1916, with the site exclusively focused on using Lyddite explosive in production.

As constructed, the factory comprised only the northerly located No.1 unit, designed to fill 100 tonnes (98 long tons; 110 short tons) of product per week, using just over 1,400 workers. Internal copper tramways, and wooden trucks with copper wheels (so that they did not create sparks), were used to move components and finished shells between buildings and the stores. Empty shells were first inspected, then cleaned and if required, painted. They were then moved to one side of one of 22 melt houses, with the explosive powder held on the opposite side of the building, which was surrounded by a blast-wall. Completed shells were then moved to the two purposefully small filled-shell magazines to the east, and hence quickly moved off-site to an Army Ordnance Department store.

No.2 unit to the south was completed less than a year later, with layout modifications incorporated to improve safety and efficiency. This brought the total occupied production area up to 132 acres (53 ha). On 30 May 1917, a notice was issued by the British Army on the Italian Front, that from now on Quarter Masters were "to only to order and accept the excellent quality shells from NFF No.9," in an effort to invigorate the factory workers.

As the Army switched to TNT explosive in its shells, by September 1917 sections of the factory began switching to the production of filling naval mines and shrapnel shells.

From June 1918, alongside the supporting plants at Chittenden and ROF Rotherwas, all three were supplied with dichloroethyl sulphide by the National Smelting Company at Avonmouth Docks, to produce mustard gas shells.

Under the management of Captain H.W. Snowball, at the height of the war the average output of shells from the facility was 70,000 per week, giving employment to 933 men and 548 women. Due to manual handling of cordite and sulphur, the workers gained hives and risked yellow skin discolouration, hence the locals called the female workers "canaries".

== Post war ==
After the cessation of activities, the site was mothballed from December 1918. Leased from mid-1919 to Cohen's of London, they used it in reverse to break-down surplus war ammunition, remaining in operation with a vastly reduced workforce until 1924. 100 men and 72 women worked there in 1919. Its final closure was declared in 1927.

A then confidential memorandum was sent to Horace Lester on 18 May 1917 by Captain Snowball with idea that the factory could be used for another manufacturing purpose after the war, like the motor depot at Slough Trading Estate had been listed for.

There was a smaller satellite depot on the Middleton Road, Grimsbury, in Banbury during 1919 and it was reactivated in World War II. 20 World War II anti-tank phosphorus grenades and a small number of World War I phosphorus grenades were dug up by developers and defused by the army in 2012.

After that time, the Ministry of Defence stripped the plant of its machinery, used mainly to keep the similar facility at ROF Rotherwas operational. By the early 1930s, little was left except the buildings and the connecting ends of the railway sidings, and the site began use as an early urban-scale military training facility. Training activity increased greatly in the run-up to World War II, particularly for the Home Guard, so much so that the Nazi Luftwaffe dropped bombs beyond the site at Bowling Green in 1940, in the belief that the site again was operating a filling factory.

== Present ==
Today, the site is a protected site of archaeological significance, although none of the buildings remain. Their layout can be seen within the residual site - now returned to use as rough pasture - as can the eastern earthworks of No.2 and much of the earthworks of No.1 site, that was not consumed by construction of the M40 motorway. An English Heritage monument commemorates the operations of the facility.

During the extension south of the M40 motorway, excavations at Junction 11 for Banbury revealed a number of former facility structures and buildings, which took a considerable amount of effort and decontamination to remove. Half of No.2 site and the western section of No.1 site now west of the M40 has been consumed by the expansion of Banbury.

== See also ==
- History of Banbury
