= Verney Junction =

Hamlet in Buckinghamshire, England

Coordinates: 51.9400°N 0.9292°W

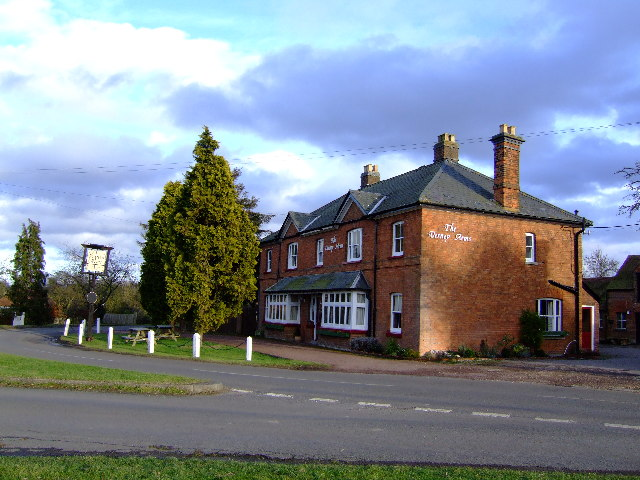
The Verney Arms, the local pub, 2006

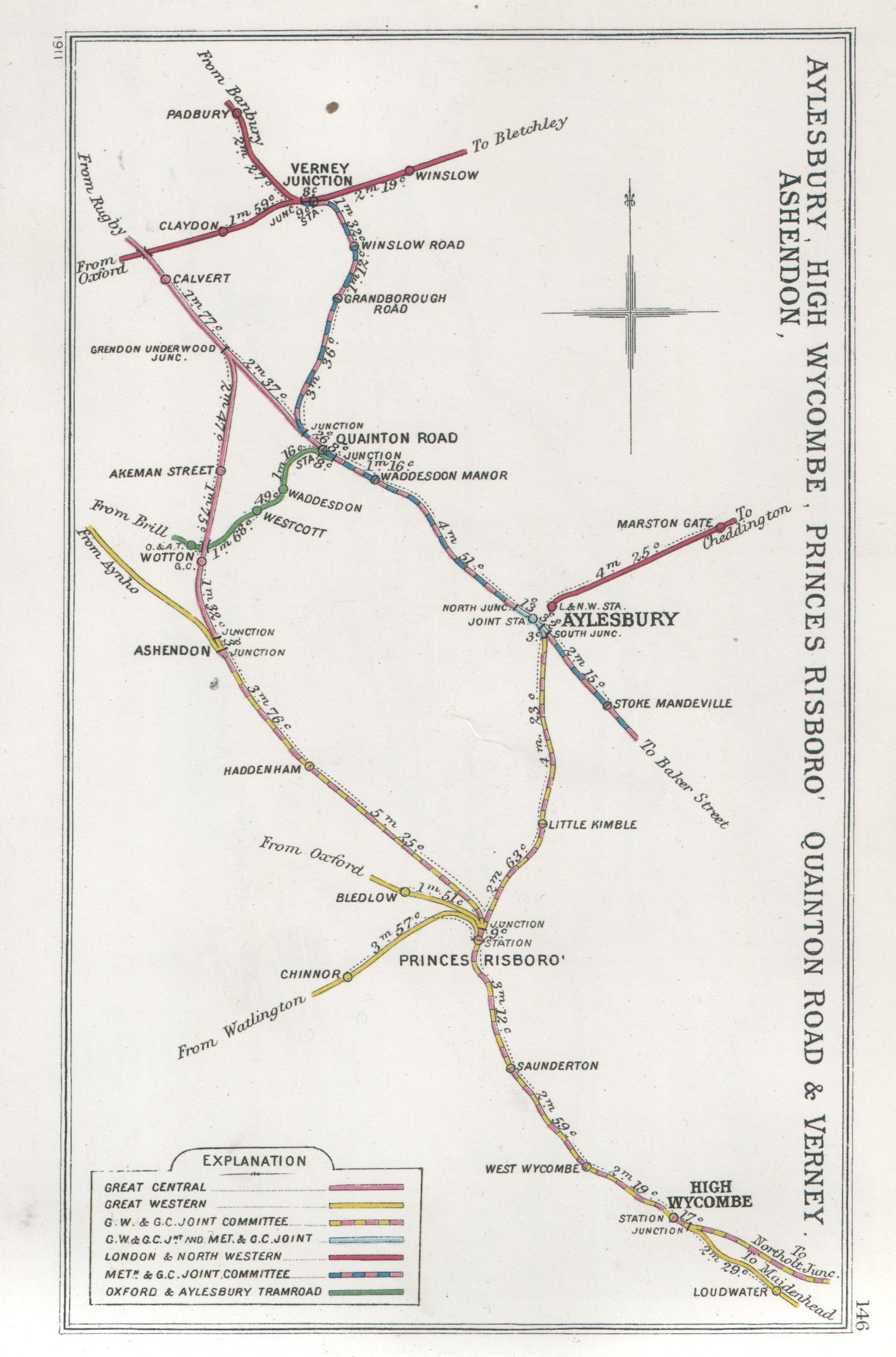
A 1911 Railway Clearing House map of railways leading to Verney Junction

Verney Junction is a hamlet in the parish of Middle Claydon in north Buckinghamshire, England. It is on the route of the former Varsity Line. As of December 2017, the line is disused but is scheduled to be reopened by about 2025 as part of the East West Rail project.

The stone cottages that make up the hamlet were largely constructed to provide houses for workers on the railway in the early Victorian era. The hamlet is named after the railway junction around which it grew. The new village included a cricket ground for the railway workers.

The original junction here was established (without a station) by the Buckinghamshire Railway, which planned a Bletchley – Banbury route (subsequently the 'Banbury to Verney Junction Branch Line') and a Bletchley – Oxford route. The Bletchley – Banbury Merton Street section was completed in May 1850 and the section from here to Oxford Rewley Road was completed in October of the same year. Verney Junction railway station was added when the Metropolitan Railway was extended here (from Baker Street).
