= Chenderit School =

Location
- Archery Road; Middleton Cheney; Banbury, Oxfordshire, OX17 2QR; England; 52.07725°N 1.26836°W

Information
- Type: Academy
- Motto: Aim High, Work Hard, Be Kind
- Established: 1979
- Local authority: West Northamptonshire
- Department for Education URN: 137878 Tables
- Ofsted: Reports
- Head teacher: Chris Billings
- Gender: Coeducational
- Age: 11 to 18
- Enrolment: 1062
- Hours in school day: 6 hours 25 minutes
- Colours: Red, white and black
- Website: chenderit.northants.sch.uk

Chenderit School is a coeducational 11–18 secondary school with specialist status in the visual arts in Middleton Cheney near Banbury, England, which opened in 1979 on fields which it is said were formerly used for archery practice. The name is an adaptation of a medieval name for Middleton Cheney.

The school attracts students from outside its catchment area and now has over 1,100. In August 2012, it became an academy.

== The Michael Heseltine Gallery ==
The Art Gallery that has constant exhibition that changes every term. The gallery holds many different forms of art such as painting, drawing, textiles, photography and sculpture. The Gallery is named after politician Michael Heseltine.

A purpose built gallery, it opened in September 2003 at the entrance to the school. It is made from glass and galvanised steel with cedar panelling and is used for a range of exhibitions by contemporary artists, craftspeople, and photographers during school terms. Private individuals, artists or art societies can book the gallery space for their own exhibitions during school holidays. Talks by the exhibiting artists are also available.

== Chenderit Sixth Form ==
Chenderit School currently has approximately 182 sixth form students on roll. In September 2022, the Sixth Form was graded as outstanding by Ofsted
