= Farthinghoe railway station =

Former railway station in Northamptonshire, England

Coordinates: 52.0593°N 1.2401°W

Farthinghoe
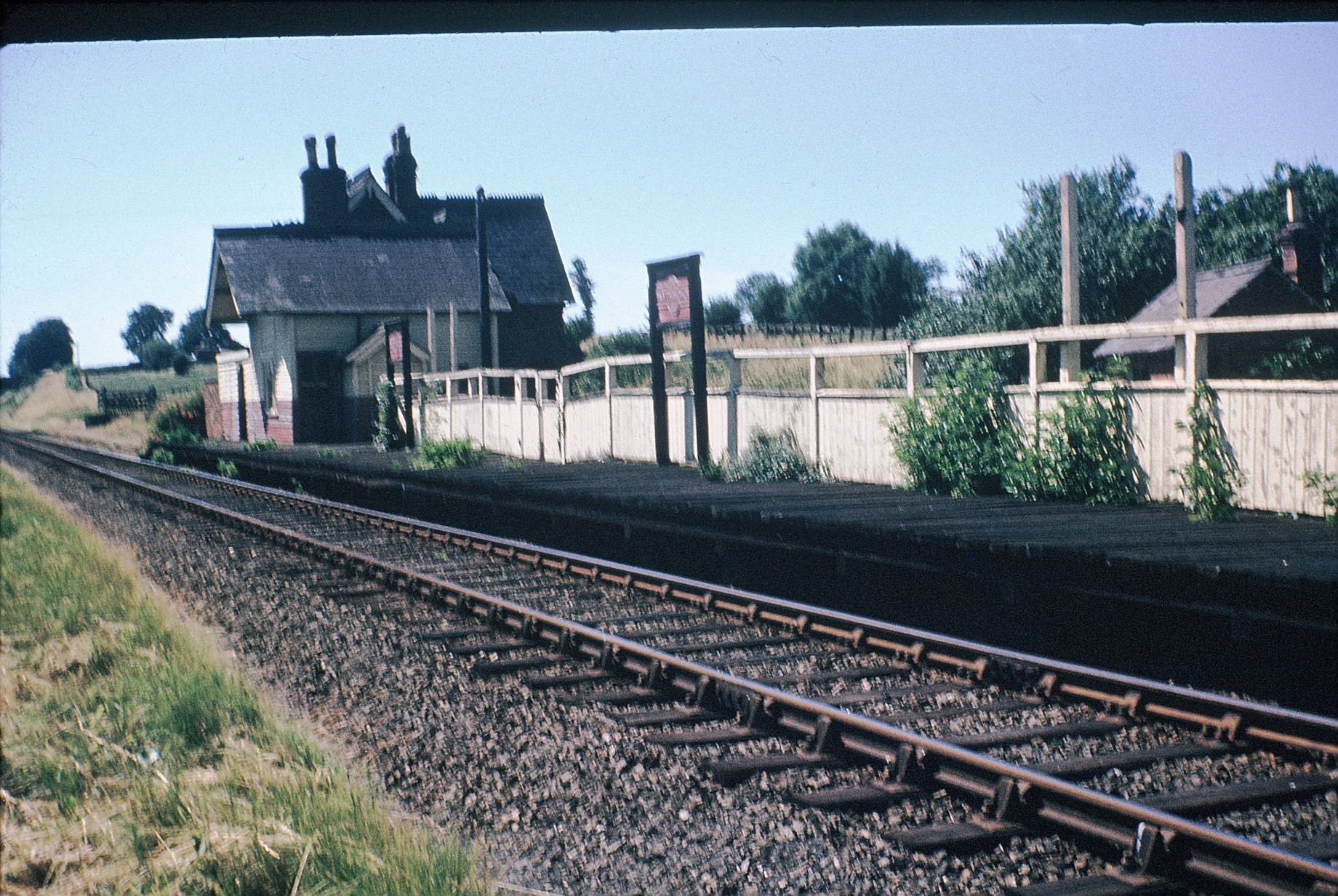
- Station in 1959.

General information
- Location: Farthinghoe, West Northamptonshire; England
- Grid reference: SP522403
- Platforms: 1

Other information
- Status: Disused

History
- Original company: Buckinghamshire Railway
- Pre-grouping: London and North Western Railway
- Post-grouping: London, Midland and Scottish Railway; London Midland Region of British Railways

Key dates
- c. October 1851: Opened
- 3 November 1952: Closed to passengers
- 2 December 1963: Closed to goods
Location

Farthinghoe was a railway station which served the Northamptonshire village of Farthinghoe in England. It opened in 1851 as part of the Buckinghamshire Railway's branch line to Verney Junction which provided connections to Bletchley and Oxford and closed in 1963.

== History ==
Situated in an isolated location over a mile from the village from which it took its name - and further still from two others it was supposed to serve: Greatworth and Middleton Cheney - Farthinghoe station first appeared in timetables in October 1851. Its precise opening date is unknown, but was almost certainly within one year of the line's inauguration.

The Buckinghamshire Railway provided basic facilities which consisted of a single wooden platform and solitary goods siding on the up side of the line. The main station building, a part-timber and part-brick structure in an "H" shape, was of unusual construction, with the main ticket office and booking hall housed in a one-storey weather-boarded wing with a steeply pitched gable roof which projected over the platform as a sort of makeshift canopy. The stationmaster occupied an adjacent two-storey building which was linked with the ticket office by a two-storey tile-hung central block which contained a waiting room. The style of construction can be explained by the Buckingham Railway's need to save on costs in the face of an economic crisis.

The station boasted limited goods facilities, with a cattle dock and weigh bridge provided for the mainly agricultural traffic. Until the mid-1930s, goods trains would shunt the siding daily with regular loads of pink roadstone granite as well as coal for W. Palmer & Son, local coal merchants. The Second World War saw Farthinghoe handle ammunition destined for the RAF's Hinton-in-the-Hedges Airfield.

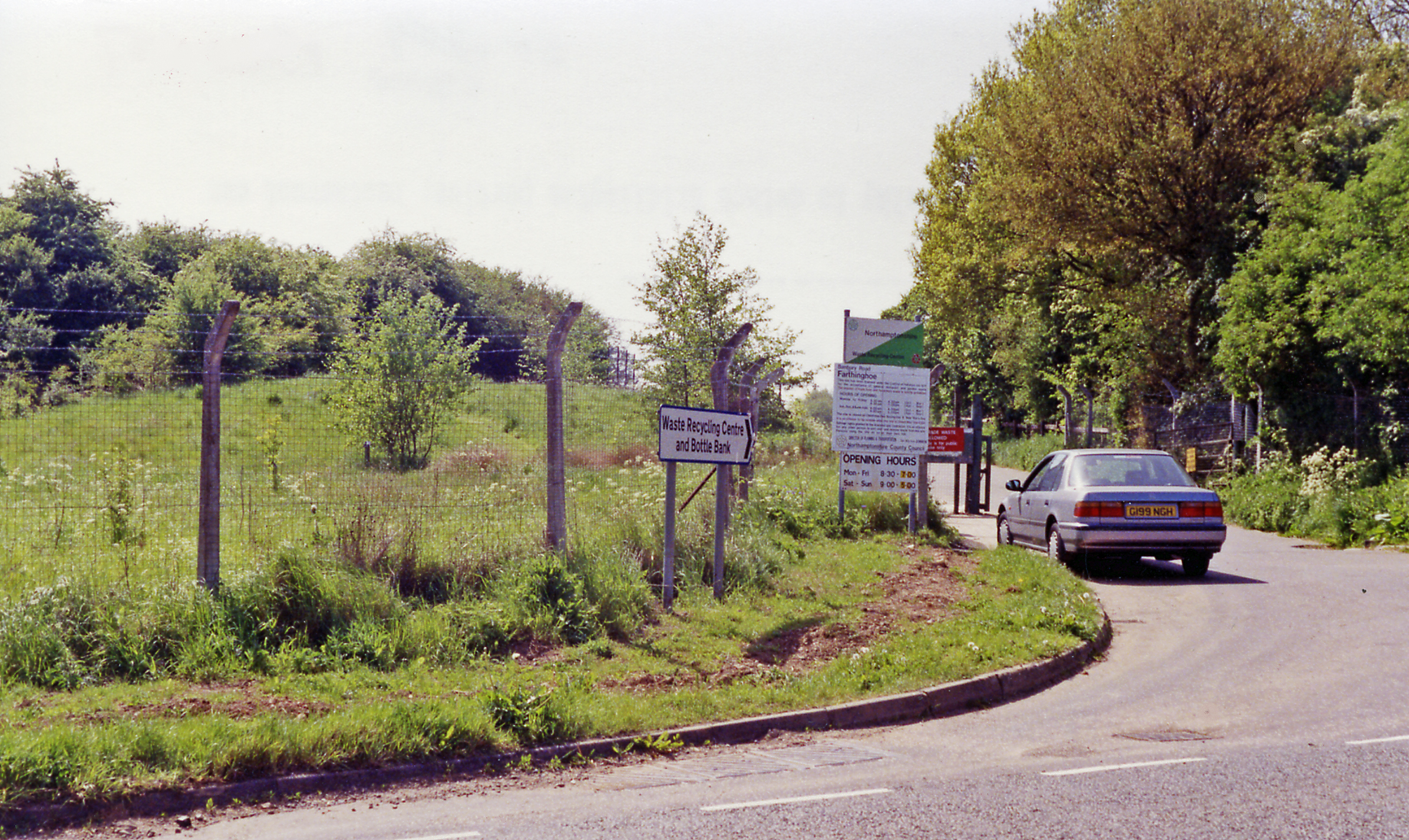
Station location in 1992

Farthinghoe station was situated on the busiest section of the line, the 5 1/2-mile (8.9 km) stretch from Merton Street to Cockley Brake, where there was a junction with the Stratford-upon-Avon and Midland Junction Railway (SMJ). Opened on 1 June 1872, the section provided connections to Towcester and Blisworth. The LNWR and SMJ jointly served Farthinghoe and Merton Street until they were absorbed into the London, Midland and Scottish Railway on 1 January 1923 upon the railway grouping. The station lost its stationmaster from 1930 and came under the control of Banbury, only 3½ miles away. Former SMJ passenger services were withdrawn as from 2 July 1951. Farthinghoe was itself to close to passengers the following year.

== Routes ==
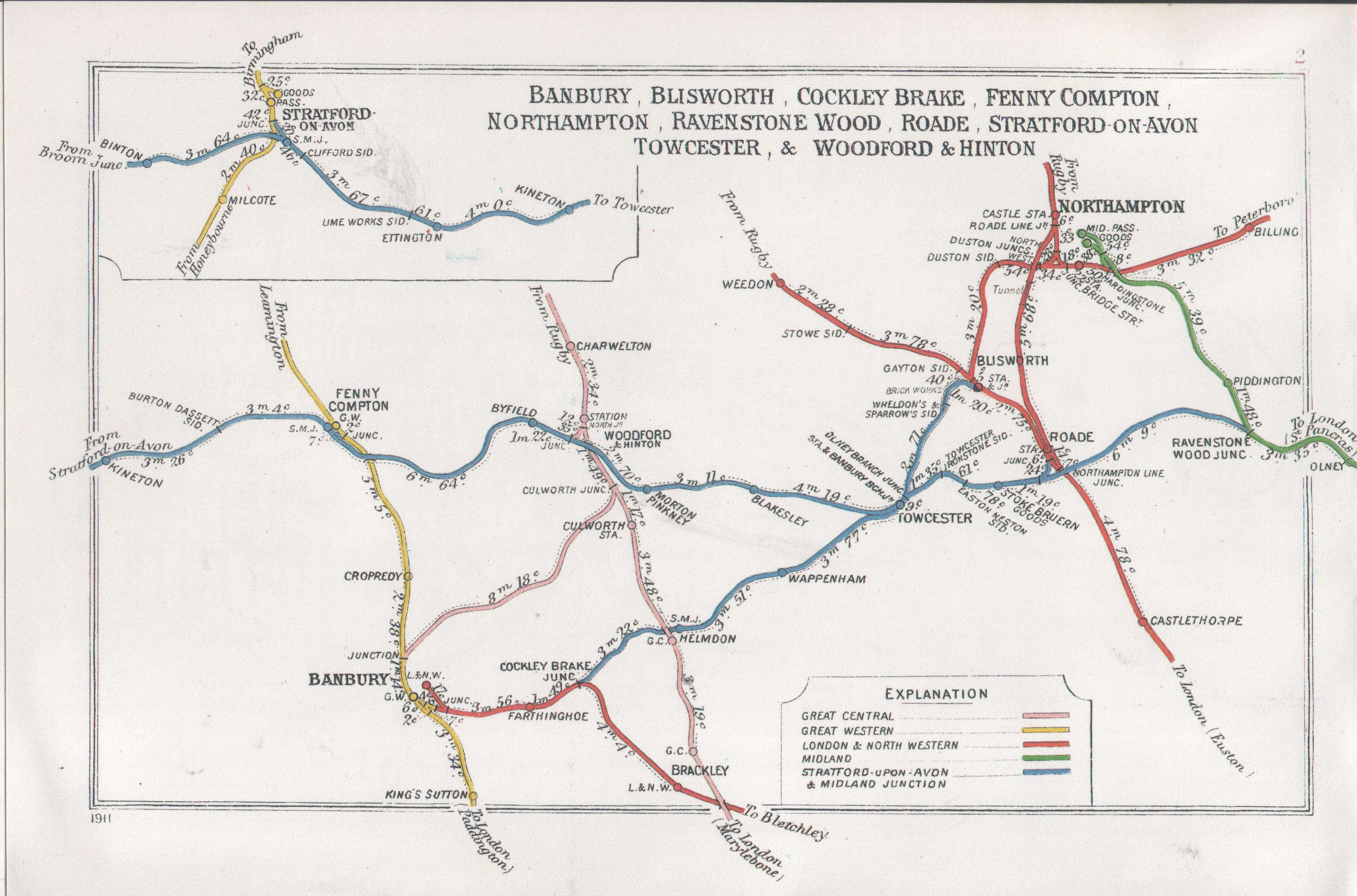
A 1911 Railway Clearing House map of railways in the vicinity of Farthinghoe (lower left, in red)

Preceding station	Disused railways	Following station
Banbury Merton Street; Line and station closed	London and North Western Railway; Banbury to Verney Junction Branch Line	Brackley; Line and station closed
Banbury Merton Street; Line and station closed	Stratford-upon-Avon and Midland Junction Railway; Northampton and Banbury Junction Railway	Helmdon Village; Line and station closed

== Present day ==
The station buildings have been demolished and replaced by a council dump and pulveriser plant. One feature has, however, survived - a plum tree which stood in the stationmaster's garden. The meadow which adjoined the station and which was used for holding cattle and sheep prior to transfer to Banbury Market is now part of Farthinghoe Nature Reserve.

== Sources ==
- Butt, R. V. J. (October 1995). The Directory of Railway Stations: details every public and private passenger station, halt, platform and stopping place, past and present (1st ed.). Sparkford: Patrick Stephens Ltd. ISBN 978-1-85260-508-7. OCLC 60251199. OL 11956311M.
- Clinker, C.R. (October 1978). Clinker's Register of Closed Passenger Stations and Goods Depots in England, Scotland and Wales 1830-1977. Bristol, Avon: Avon-AngliA Publications & Services. ISBN 0-905466-19-5.
- Davies, R.; Grant, M.D. (1984). Forgotten Railways: Chilterns and Cotswolds. Newton Abbot, Devon: David St John Thomas. ISBN 0-946537-07-0.
- Jenkins, Stanley C. (1990). The Northampton & Banbury Junction Railway. Headington, Oxfordshire: The Oakwood Press. ISBN 0-85361-390-7.
- Kingscott, Geoffrey (2008). Lost Railways of Northamptonshire (Lost Railways Series). Newbury, Berkshire: Countryside Books. ISBN 978-1-84674-108-1.
- Simpson, Bill (1994). Banbury to Verney Junction Branch. Banbury, Oxfordshire: Lamplight Publications. ISBN 978-1-899246-00-7.
