= Farthinghoe =

Village in Northamptonshire, England

Coordinates: 52.0513°N 1.2212°W

- Location within Northamptonshire
- Population: 418; 413 (2011 census)
- OS grid reference: SP5339
  - London: 71 miles (114 km)
- Unitary authority: West Northamptonshire
- Ceremonial county: Northamptonshire
- Region: East Midlands
- Country: England
- Sovereign state: United Kingdom
- Post town: Brackley
- Postcode district: NN13
- Dialling code: 01295
- Police: Northamptonshire
- Fire: Northamptonshire
- Ambulance: East Midlands
- UK Parliament: Daventry

Farthinghoe is a village and civil parish in West Northamptonshire, England. It is located on the A422 road about 3 miles (4.8 km) north-west of Brackley and 5 miles (8.0 km) south-east of Banbury.

The origin of the village's name is uncertain. Possibly, 'hill-spur of the dwellers among the ferns' or perhaps, 'ferny-place hill spur'.

At the time of the 2001 census, the parish's population was 418 people, reducing slightly to 413 at the 2011 census.

== Buildings ==
The parish church is dedicated to St Michael and of 13th-century origin. There are monuments to Henrietta and Catherine Rush (d.1801) and George Rush (d.1806). This is by the celebrated London sculptor, Charles Regnart.

Other buildings of note are Abbey Lodge west of the church, believed to be 1581 and Farthinghoe Lodge about 1 mile south west. The village hall on Cockley Road.

Most of the village is a conservation area.

Farthinghoe railway station closed completely in 1963.

== Facilities ==
The village primary school is Farthinghoe County Primary School. Sound and air pollution caused by the traffic along with speeding is a major concern to the pupils of the school.

There is a pub The Fox in Baker Street.

== Transport ==
The road through the village (the A422) has two sharp, narrow bends. HGVs gets stuck at these narrow bends often causing traffic chaos. It was resurfaced in 2015 after being damaged by traffic.

== See also ==
- Parish Council
