= Banbury Merton Street railway station =

Disused railway station in Banbury, Cherwell

Coordinates: 52.05914°N 1.32319°W

Banbury Merton Street
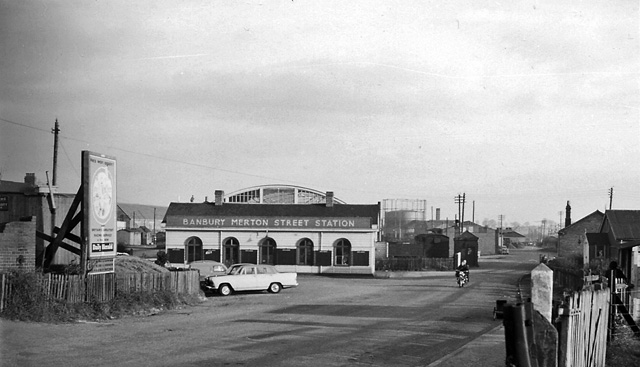
- Station building in March 1961.

General information
- Location: Banbury, Cherwell, Oxfordshire; England
- Grid reference: SP463405
- Platforms: 2

Other information
- Status: Disused

History
- Original company: Buckinghamshire Railway
- Pre-grouping: London and North Western Railway
- Post-grouping: London, Midland and Scottish Railway; London Midland Region of British Railways

Key dates
- 1 May 1850: Opened (Banbury)
- By April 1910: Renamed (Banbury Merton Street)
- 2 January 1961: Closed to passengers
- 6 June 1966: Closed to goods
Location

Banbury Merton Street was the first railway station to serve the Oxfordshire market town of Banbury in England. It opened in 1850 as the northern terminus of the Buckinghamshire Railway providing connections to Bletchley and Oxford and closing for passengers in 1961 and goods in 1966.

== History ==
=== Context ===
Banbury Merton Street was the northern terminus of the Buckinghamshire Railway which consisted of two lines: one from Bletchley to Banbury and another from Verney Junction to Oxford. Construction of the line had begun in July 1847 but was beset by delays and financial problems; priority was given to the construction of the line to Banbury and this was completed on 30 March 1849, with the section from Claydon to Banbury being built to single track rather than double as had been intended. The Oxford branch was opened on 1 October 1850 as far as Islip, reaching a temporary station at Oxford Road on 2 December.

The line was to be worked from the outset by the London and North Western Railway (LNWR) which had supported the building of the line and which was represented on the board of the Buckinghamshire Railway by Edward Watkin who, together with the Duke of Buckingham and local landowner Sir Harry Verney MP, was one of the driving forces behind the line.

=== Opening and early years ===
The opening of the line on 1 May 1850 took place amid great celebrations in Banbury; the first train departed at 6.30am to a crowd of onlookers but with few paying passengers. More passengers joined the later trains at 9.45am and 1.45pm which were bound for Bletchley where they were met by flags and a brass band. The LNWR provided an initial service of four trains per day, with special excursion trains being laid on for major events such as the 1851 Great Exhibition which attracted 7,072 passengers. Goods traffic was carried as from 15 May and the railway soon became an important factor in the development of the farm machinery industry which continued until right up to the early 1930s.

Four months after the opening of Banbury Merton Street, the Great Western Railway (GWR) opened a second station in Banbury on its London to Birmingham line. The station, later to be known as Banbury General, opened on 2 September 1850 and is today Banbury's only remaining station. The two stations were within walking distance. The GWR had unsuccessfully opposed the Act of Parliament authorising the construction of the Buckinghamshire Railway, promoting instead the Birmingham & Oxford Junction Railway scheme which included a series of loop lines into Buckinghamshire. The scheme was authorised without the loop lines which became the basis of the Buckinghamshire Railway.

Although the Buckinghamshire Railway was moderately prosperous in its early years, it began operating at a loss as a result of a decision to re-route freight through Oxford and Didcot, and the depression that affected railway shares in the late 1850s. It was absorbed by the LNWR on 23 February 1878. By this point it was accepted that Banbury Merton Street was unlikely to develop to anything more than the terminus of a rural branch, the territory to the north and west having been secured by the GWR.

=== Zenith ===
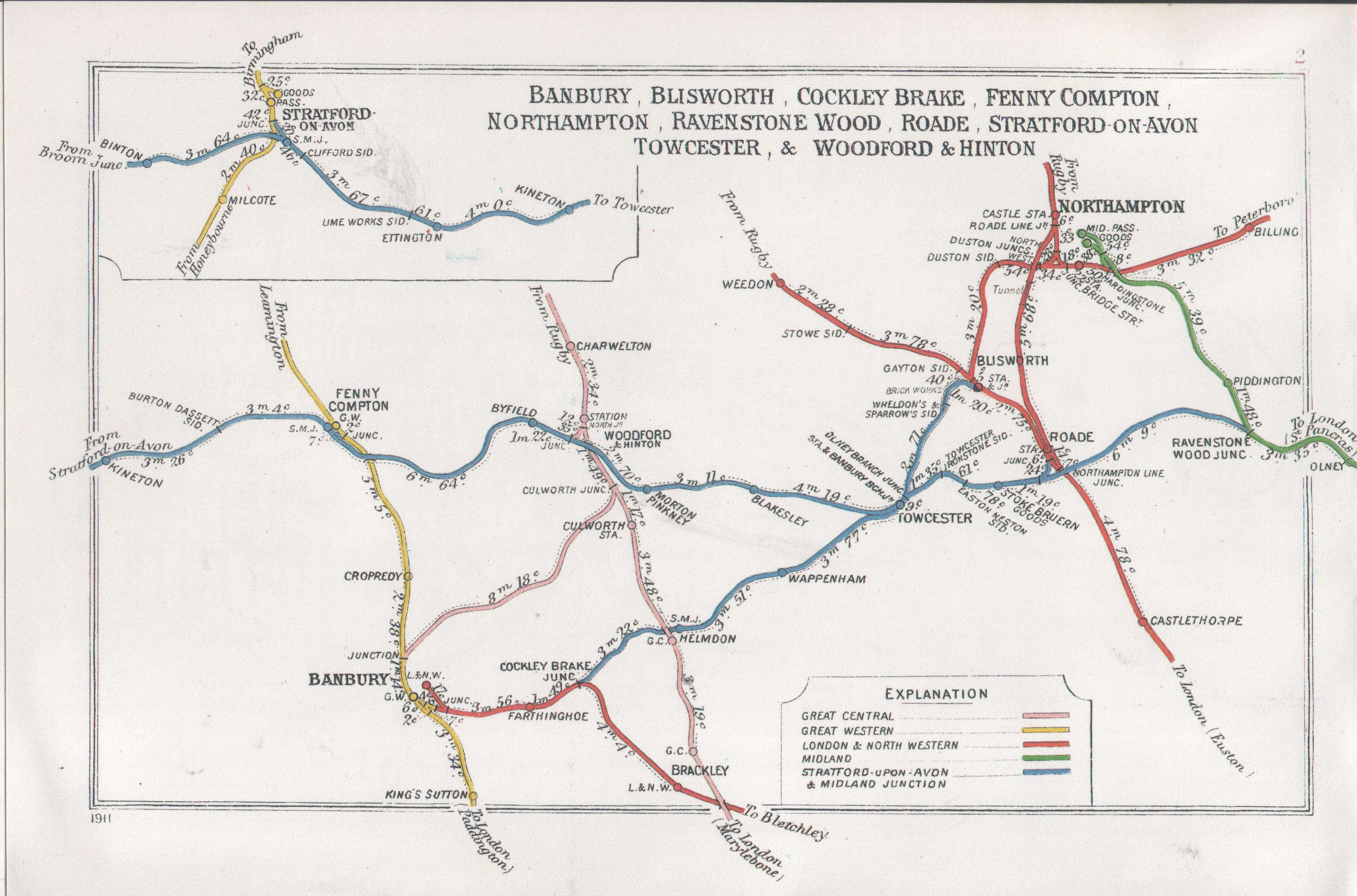
A 1911 Railway Clearing House map of railways in the vicinity of Banbury (lower left; Banbury Merton Street is in red labelled "L.&N.W.")

Banbury Merton Street reached its peak of passenger and goods traffic at the outbreak of the First World War. In 1916, the Ministry of Munitions constructed a National Filling Factory on the northern side of the line near Warkworth Crossing approximately 1 1/2 miles (2.4 km) from the station platforms. The factory was linked to the line by a standard gauge railway system extending to 3 1/2 miles (5.6 km) of track. The factory closed in 1919 and the site was taken over by Messrs Cohen of London who converted it into a factory to break-down thousands of tons of war materials, a process which continued until 1924. In addition to the munitions traffic, Banbury Merton Street also handled troop trains converging from north to south.

The 1920s also coincided with a period of growth in Banbury's industries. United Dairies had made Banbury a collecting centre for milk in 1920 and later introduced a system of glass-lined tanks to carry milk in bulk from Banbury General. As a result of its success the company began using Merton Street to transport milk north via the Great Central Railway. In 1921 the Midland Marts Company opened a stockyard alongside the station where cattle could be loaded and unloaded from the railway to be taken on to market.

The growth in Merton Street's freight traffic was however matched by a fall in passenger numbers, with Banbury General becoming the town's principal passenger railhead. By 1938, the London, Midland and Scottish Railway (which had taken over the station upon the 1923 railway grouping) attempted to phase out Merton Street by agreeing with the Great Western to rebuild the two stations as a single unit situated on the road bridge to the north of the present Banbury station. Owing to the outbreak of the Second World War, this plan was never put into action and Merton Street was once again busy with troop trains.

Preceding station	Disused railways	Following station
Terminus	London and North Western Railway; Buckinghamshire Railway	Farthinghoe; Line and station closed
Terminus	Stratford-upon-Avon and Midland Junction Railway; Northampton and Banbury Junction Railway	Farthinghoe; Line and station closed

=== Decline and closure ===
The post-war period saw a further decline in passenger numbers at Merton Street, however freight receipts remained steady as a result of Midland Mart's continued activities. Around 200 cattle vans were handled during per week, the cattle being sorted on arrival and then dispatched for the sheep fair on Tuesday and the T.T. cattle on Wednesday; Thursday brought further cattle traffic as it was market day in Banbury. These activities continued until the early 1960s when British Railways began to phase them out.

In August 1956 the Banbury - Buckingham section of the line became the subject of a railcar experiment which saw two new halts open on the line at Radclive and Water Stratford. After three years of service, the railcar had not succeeded in stemming the line's losses and a proposal to withdraw passenger services was published in July 1960, with the last passenger train running on 31 December. Whereas trains had run virtually every half-an-hour, the replacement bus services provided by the Midland Red Bus Company ran only twice a day: at 7.25am and 3.31pm.

The line remained open to Buckingham for the purposes of cattle traffic until 1963 with traffic then using the connecting spur to Banbury "General" station until 1966. Track-lifting commenced the following year. The remaining station, Banbury General, was subsequently renamed as simply "Banbury".

== Station buildings and track layout ==
From Farthinghoe the track curved round to the west to run nearly parallel with the Great Western's line from Oxford to Banbury before entering Merton Street (21 3/4 miles (35.0 km) from Bletchley). The wooden main station building was frugally built with a timber island platform covered by a glazed roof supported by steel columns. A timber goods shed was initially provided to be later rebuilt in brick. The locomotive shed had capacity for eight engines and up to 1934 acted as a sub-depot for Bletchley with men rostered there. A cattle dock and sidings were provided to handle the substantial agricultural traffic; sidings also led to the nearby gasworks and the Great Western's Banbury yard. The timber boarding on the station roof had by 1956 reached such a condition that it posed a danger to passengers and it was removed leaving the metal supports and piping which were painted white.

== Present day ==
The main station building was swept away soon after closure, leaving the brick goods shed to be used for some time by British Road Services as a storage depot. The station site has been redeveloped for housing. One of the roads on the estate is "Marshall Road", so-named after Merton Street's last stationmaster Arthur Marshall.

== See also ==
- History of Banbury, Oxfordshire
- Grimsbury
