= Verney Junction railway station =

Disused railway station in Buckinghamshire, England

Verney Junction
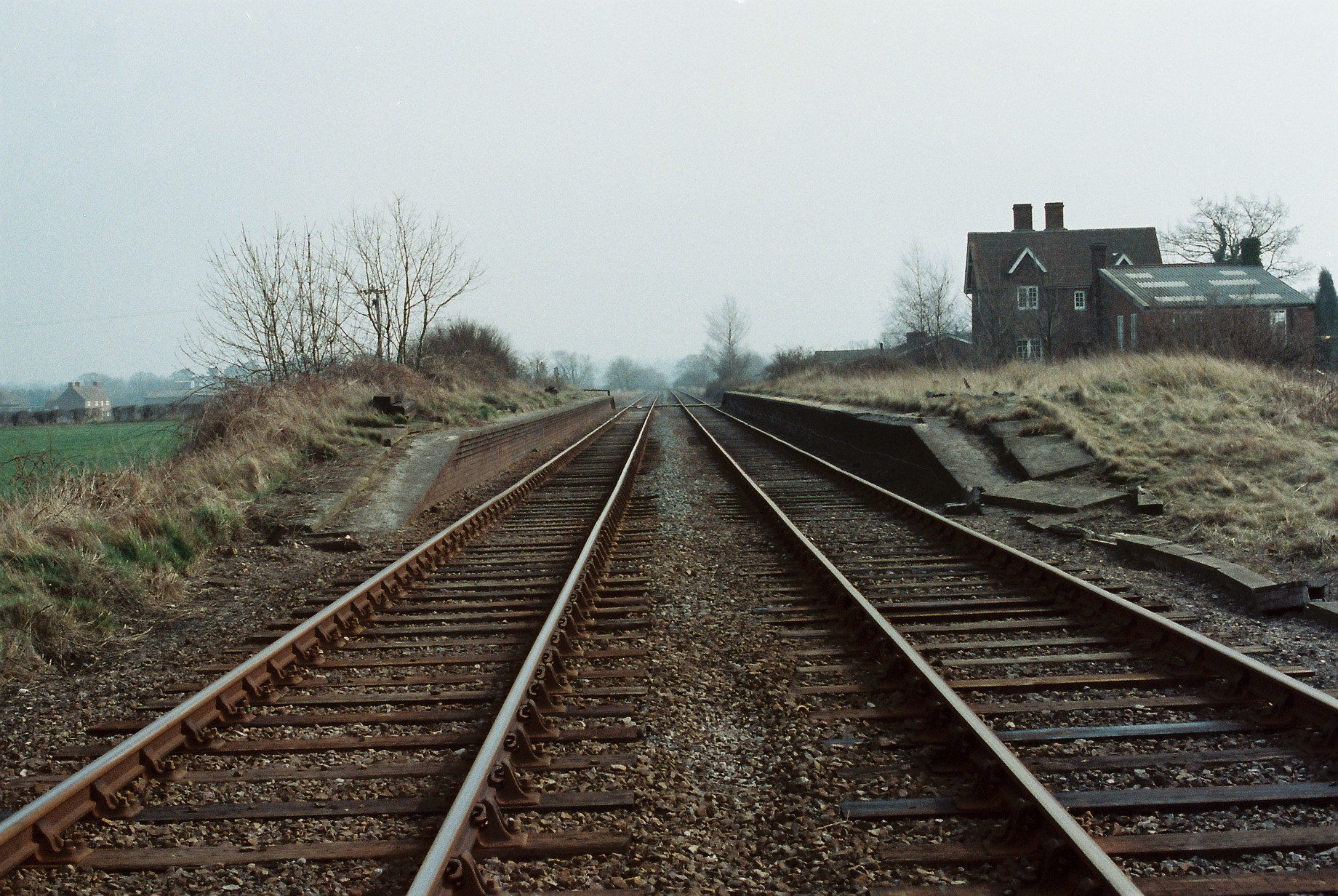
- Station site in 1983, stationmaster's house to the right

General information
- Location: Verney Junction, Buckinghamshire; England
- Coordinates: 51.9406°N 0.9300°W
- Grid reference: SP736274
- Platforms: 3

Other information
- Status: Disused

History
- Original company: Aylesbury and Buckingham Railway, Buckinghamshire Railway
- Pre-grouping: London and North Western Railway/Metropolitan and Great Central Joint Railway
- Post-grouping: London Midland and Scottish Railway/Metropolitan and Great Central Joint Railway (1923–1947); Eastern Region of British Railways (1948–1962); London Midland Region of British Railways (1962–1968)

Key dates
- 23 September 1868: Opened
- 6 July 1936: Metropolitan passenger services withdrawn
- 6 January 1964: Closed to goods
- 1 January 1968: Closed to passengers
Location

Verney Junction railway station was an isolated railway station at a four-way railway junction in Buckinghamshire, open from 1868 to 1968; a junction existed at the site without a station from 1851.

The first line to open on the site was the Buckinghamshire Railway, which opened a line from Bletchley to Banbury in 1850; a line branching west to Oxford followed in 1851. This formed an east–west link from Oxford to Bletchley and Cambridge passing through Verney Junction and this, known as the Varsity line, became the busiest line through the site, leaving the line to Banbury as a relatively quiet branch. The station opened in 1868 concurrently with the opening of the Aylesbury and Buckingham Railway (later owned by London Underground) towards Aylesbury and London. Soon afterwards, the Buckinghamshire Railway became absorbed into the London and North Western Railway.

The lines south to Aylesbury closed to passengers in 1936 and the line to Buckingham in 1964, but the station remained open until the Oxford–Cambridge line closed to passengers in 1968. The track was singled and then mothballed, but a disused track has remained through the station site. As part of East West Rail, the line between Oxford and Bletchley is to be reopened by 2025, but because of its isolated location Verney Junction will not be reopened.

While never very busy, Verney Junction was a local interchange point for a century from which excursions as far as Ramsgate could be booked. Situated 50 miles (80 km) from Baker Street, the station is one of London's disused Underground stations and, although it never carried heavy traffic, the Aylesbury line was important in the expansion of the Metropolitan Railway into what became Metro-land.

== Station history ==
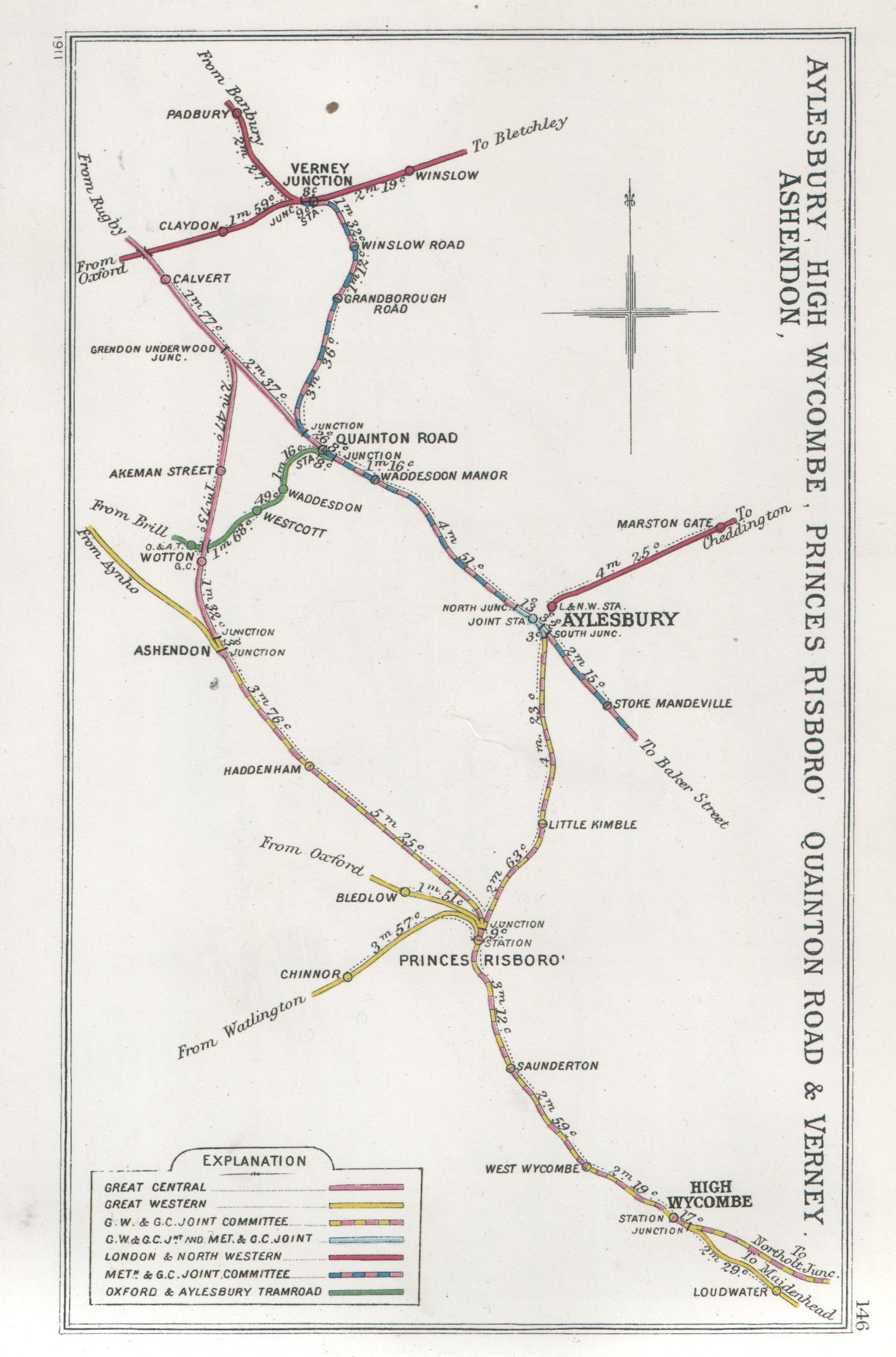
A 1911 Railway Clearing House Junction Diagram of railways in the vicinity of Verney Junction.

=== Opening ===
Verney Junction opened in 1868 as northern terminus of the Aylesbury and Buckingham Railway's (A&BR) single track from Aylesbury. The station was at a junction with the Buckinghamshire Railway's Bletchley to Oxford line, which was leased and operated by the LNWR before it acquired the route altogether in 1878. The station was built 1.75 miles (2.8 km) east of Steeple Claydon, and constructed to a rudimentary design at the cost of the A&BR, whose progress the LNWR viewed with disfavour.

Plans to extend the railway north to Buckingham never materialised and Verney Junction remained remote with a few cottages for tenants of Claydon House estate. Claydon's occupant, Sir Harry Verney, was on the board of the A&BR which was chaired by the Duke of Buckingham, and he invested heavily in the scheme. There being no settlement from which the station could take its name, it was named in honour of Sir Harry, who was later to have another nearby station – Calvert – named after him; he had been born Harry Calvert, and took the surname Verney in order to inherit his late cousin's estates in 1827.

=== Early years ===
The A&BR initially began advertising services to and from Banbury, Oxford and Bletchley but the LNWR attempted to isolate the A&BR by encouraging passengers to take its longer route to Aylesbury via Bletchley and Cheddington. The A&BR turned to the Great Western Railway (GWR), with whom it managed Aylesbury, to agree to services over the GWR's Wycombe Railway; the Wycombe line was converted to standard gauge on 23 October 1868 and A&BR services were reinstated.

The GWR worked the A&BR for more than 20 years, turning down the chance to acquire it in 1874, although for the first six years the route was operated by the A&BR's own staff, except for footplate crews who were GWR employees. Traffic was initially "almost non-existent" due to Verney Junction's rural locality, but the Metropolitan Railway under the influence of Sir Edward Watkin nevertheless saw an opportunity for growth and absorbed the A&BR on 1 July 1891. The A&BR would be the line that the London Extension of Watkin's Manchester, Sheffield and Lincolnshire Railway (MS&LR) would meet at Quainton Road. In anticipation of the connection, the A&BR was doubled by 1897 and the Metropolitan extended its line from Chalfont Road to Aylesbury in 1892.

=== Metropolitan era ===
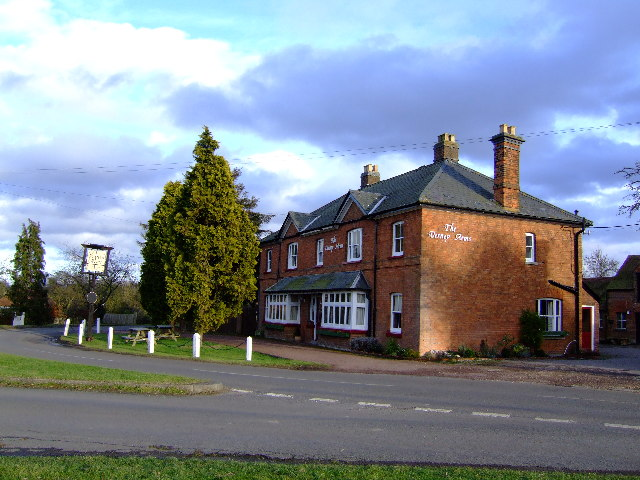
Verney Arms public house which opened in the 1890s and was known as "Station Hotel".

Not long after the Metropolitan reached its northern outpost, Verney Junction was elevated to main line status with the opening of the MS&LR's London Extension (later to be known as the Great Central Railway). Around the same time, the Metropolitan inaugurated a service of through trains between Baker Street and Verney Junction, although this could hardly be said to be merited on the basis of traffic. From 2 April 1906, all Metropolitan services north of Harrow South Junction to Verney Junction came under the control of the Metropolitan & Great Central Joint Committee which had been set up by an Act of Parliament to manage the companies' joint lines.

The Metropolitan opened another intermediate station on the A&BR at Waddesdon in 1897, adding to the three existing stations at Grandborough Road, Quainton Road and Winslow Road which had opened in 1868. A new Pullman service was introduced in 1910 as part of a drive to attract first-class paying passengers from the Great Central; two Pullman coaches named "Mayflower" and "Galatea" were used on alternate weeks between Verney Junction, Chesham and London.

The Metropolitan was vested in the London Passenger Transport Board (LPTB) on 1 July 1933 and freight and passenger workings to Verney Junction continued in trains repainted with the London Transport lettering. However, little over three years later, the LPTB decided to discontinue their services beyond Aylesbury and in consequence two Metropolitan outposts were closed — the Brill Tramway ended on 30 November 1935 and passenger services ceased between Quainton Road and Verney Junction on 6 July 1936 when the line was singled. Freight services continued until 8 September 1947 when the line closed. The track to Winslow Road was used for stock storage until 1961.

=== Decline and closure ===
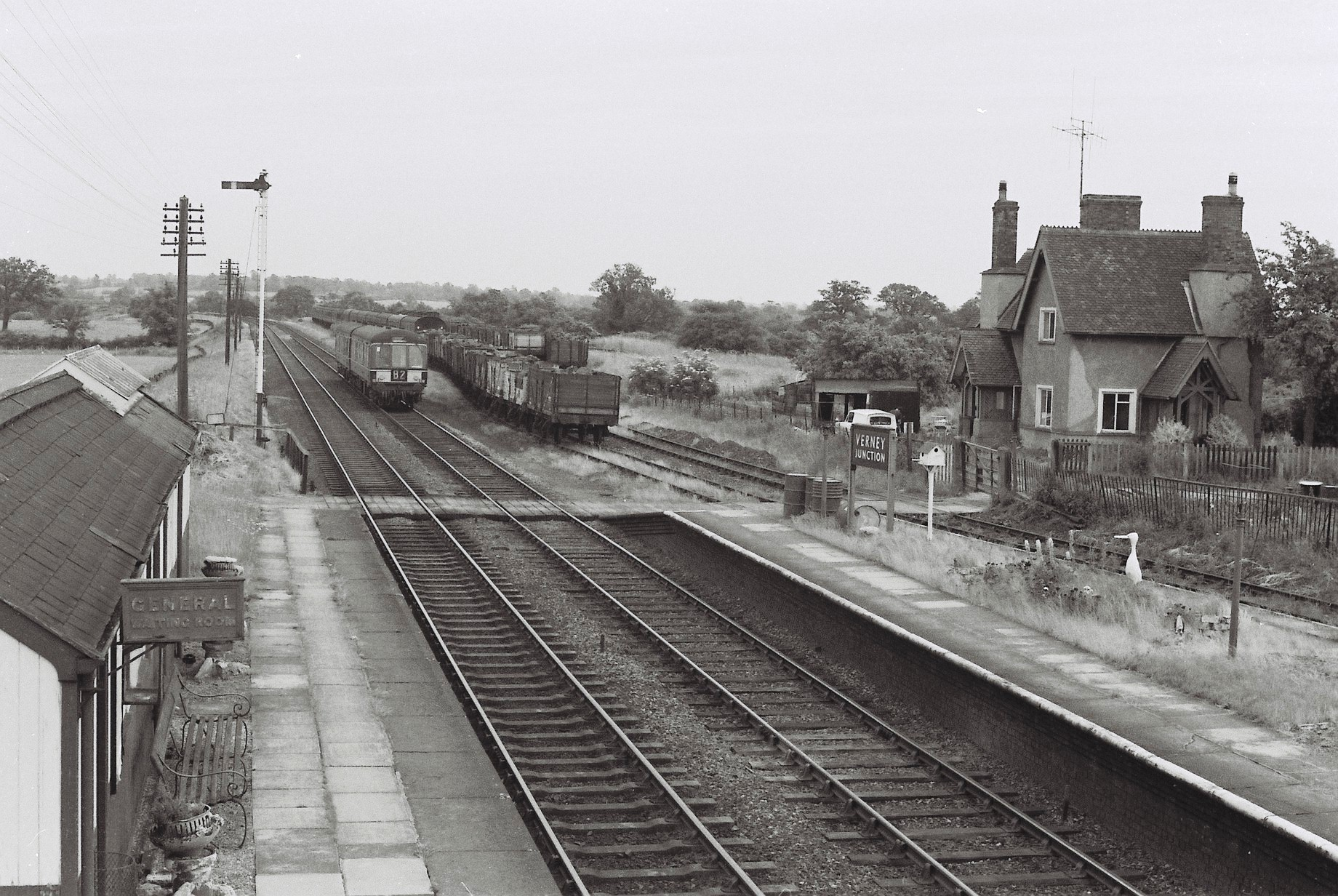
Verney Junction looking east in the 1960s

Although the two World Wars brought an increase in freight traffic from Verney Junction to London, with considerable volumes of freight passing through the station's transfer sidings, the post-war period saw a decline in the station's fortunes. The closure of the Aylesbury-Verney section by the LPTB in 1936 was followed by the removal of one of the line's tracks on 28 January 1940. In the same year, freight traffic through Verney Junction was substantially diminished by the opening on 14 September 1940 of an east-facing connecting spur between the LNWR and GCR lines at Calvert which enabled freight from the Oxford-Bletchley route to work south over the Great Central Main Line without having to pass over the Verney Junction-Quainton Road section.

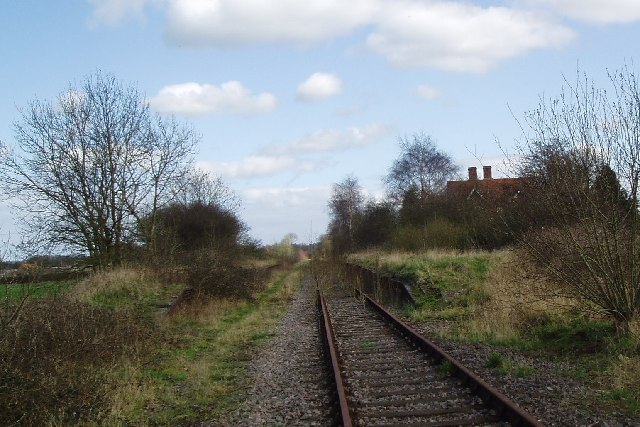
A March 2005 view taken from the approximate area of the top image from 1983

By the end of 1940, Verney Junction was effectively left "severed from its purpose", having little usefulness other than as a rural interchange for local services. It played a useful part in the transfer of goods between the interconnecting lines, but passenger traffic declined in the face of the availability of more direct routes to and from Banbury and Oxford. The track on the northern section of the A&BR between Verney Junction and Winslow Road was retained until 1961, including the former Metropolitan sidings which were subsequently used for storing veteran railway vehicles.. Goods services were withdrawn in 1964 and later that year the line to Buckingham was closed. The station closed completely when all passenger services were withdrawn in 1968.

== Routes ==
| Preceding station | Disused railways | Following station |
|---|---|---|
| Padbury | London and North Western Railway; Banbury to Verney Junction Branch Line | Winslow |
| Claydon | London and North Western Railway; Varsity Line | Winslow |
| Terminus | Metropolitan Railway; Verney Junction Branch | Winslow Road |

== Present and future ==
A single-track freight line from Bletchley to Bicester was retained and then abandoned in place in 1993. Until late 2019, this track remained rusted beyond use and in overgrown state, albeit with modern signage still warning travellers to watch for approaching trains. From early 2020, the route was cleared (and widened for two-track operation) as part of engineering works on the East West Rail project. Of the station itself, the stationmaster's house remains as a private residence, and the station ticket office has become a private garage. The stationmaster's house's garden occupies the former Metropolitan trackbed. There are no plans to reopen the station,

In December 2023, East-West Rail Partnership announced that the track laying between Bicester Village and Bletchley was 99% complete, including bridges, earthworks and an underpass at Calvert. The track was completed ceremonially on 7 March 2024. However, as of August 2026, scheduled passenger services have yet to commence.

== See also ==
- Beeching Axe
