= Brackley railway station =

Former railway station in Northamptonshire, England

Coordinates: 52.02337°N 1.14832°W

Brackley Town
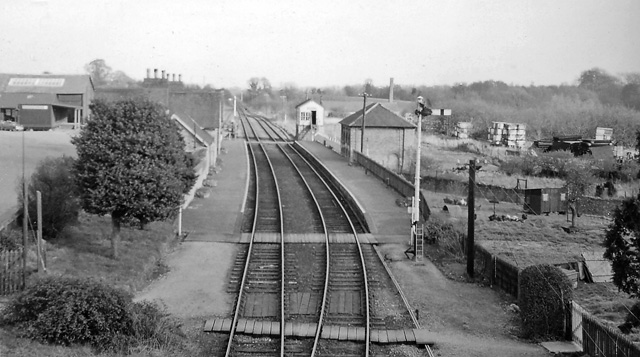
- Brackley LNWR station in 1961

General information
- Location: Brackley, West Northamptonshire, England
- Grid reference: SP585365
- Platforms: 2

Other information
- Status: Disused

History
- Original company: Buckinghamshire Railway
- Pre-grouping: London and North Western Railway
- Post-grouping: London, Midland and Scottish Railway, London Midland Region of British Railways

Key dates
- 1 May 1850: Opened
- 1 July 1950: Renamed Brackley Town
- 2 January 1961: Closed to passengers
- 2 December 1963: Closed to goods
Location

Brackley Town was a railway station which served the Northamptonshire town of Brackley, in England. It opened in 1850, as part of the Buckinghamshire Railway's branch line to Verney Junction which provided connections to Banbury, Bletchley and Oxford. It was closed in 1963.

== History ==
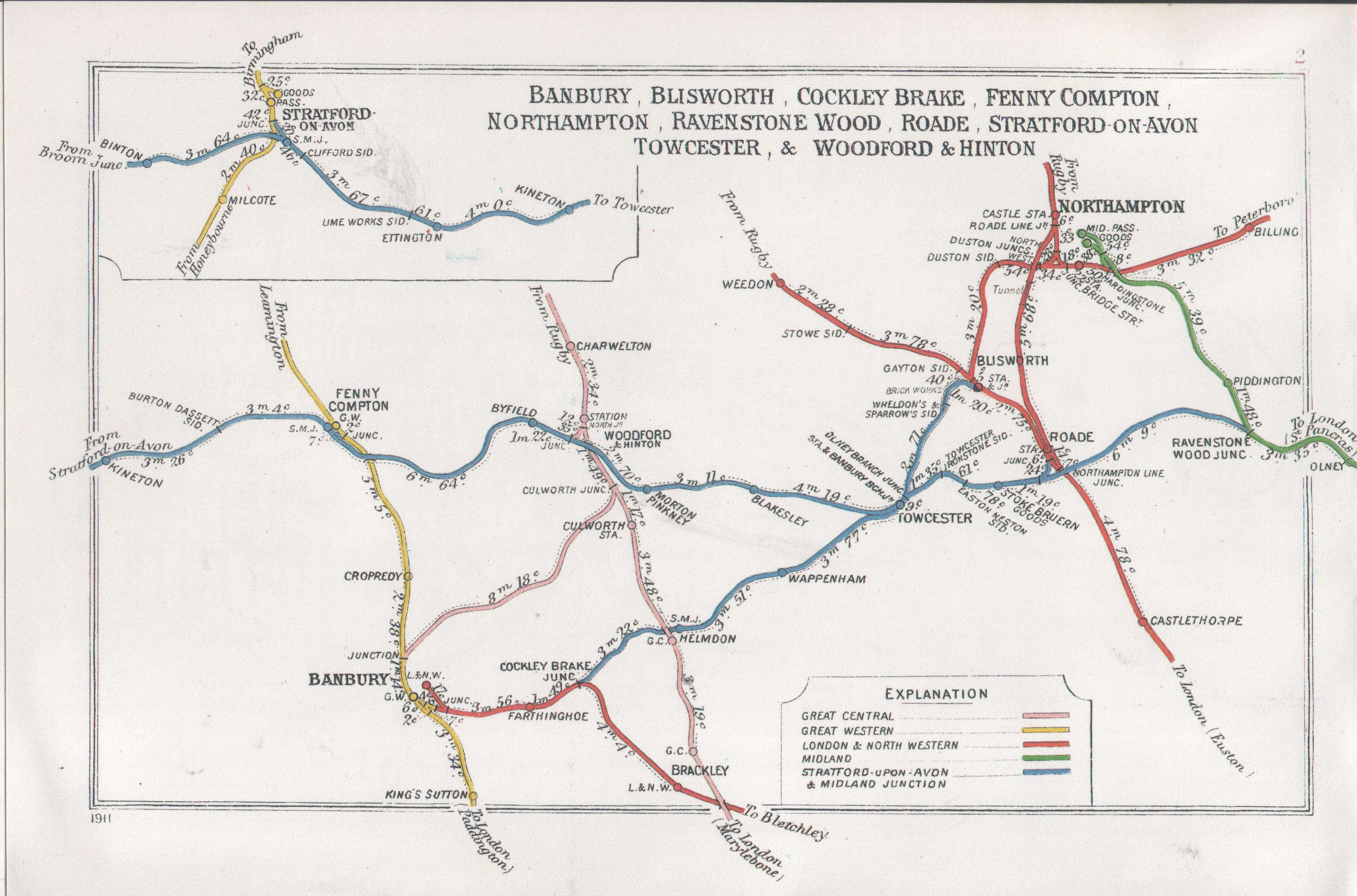
A 1911 Railway Clearing House map of railways in the vicinity of Brackley (bottom centre, in red labelled "L.&N.W.")

From 1899 until 1963, Brackley was served by two railway stations on different lines. Brackley Central was the second, opened by the Great Central Railway; the Buckinghamshire Railway had already connected the town to the railway in 1850. As the Great Central's station was constructed at the top of the hill upon which Brackley is situated and Buckinghamshire Railway's station at the foot of the hill, locals referred to them respectively as the Top Station and the Bottom Station.

The Buckinghamshire Railway's station was built at the southern end of the main high street and was constructed of a yellow-grey coloured stone. A single loop was enclosed between two-facing platforms, each of a height of 32 inches (0.8 m). A water tower for locomotives was positioned on the roof of a stone shelter situated on the up platform, slowly refilling from a nearby spring. The station's goods shed was built at a right angle to the line where a wagon turntable enabled vehicles to roll into the shed, aided by a slight gradient. A short spur on a severe gradient served the Hopkins and Norris brewery; horses drew the wagons up the gradient to allow them to be returned to the station yard by gravity. The spur (known locally as the "barrel line") fell into disuse in the early 1920s and the rails were lifted by 1935. The station's goods yard was not large, but was capable of accommodating the daily 3 to 12 wagons destined for the gasworks and the 4 to 5 wagons of malt and sugar for the brewery. A cattle dock could take four vans, and a 5-ton capacity crane was stationed in the yard.

The arrival of the Great Central in Brackley saw a great deal of trade ebb away from the branch. The Great Central provided a faster and more direct route to London; its station enjoyed seven trains a day from Marylebone, including an express which took 84 minutes, compared with the line's infrequent sparse service to London Euston via Bletchley. The branch line was used to transport bricks for the construction of the Great Central's station and a new siding was installed near the line's ten mile post.

On 13 May 1950, King George VI and Queen Elizabeth arrived at Brackley station en route to the first official British Grand Prix held at Silverstone. At the last minute, it was discovered that the platform would be too low for the Royal Train's exit door and so an old wooden ammunition box had to be found and upended next to the door.

The station was renamed Brackley Town on 1 July 1950, but only for goods traffic. The goods yard and through freight traffic ceased on 2 December 1963, nearly three years after the last passenger service had called.

| Preceding station | Disused railways | Following station |
|---|---|---|
| Farthinghoe | London and North Western Railway; Banbury to Verney Junction Branch Line | Fulwell & Westbury |

== The site today ==
All of the station buildings have been demolished. The various parts of the site are now occupied by a new road (St. James Road), a grassed area, a police station, an industrial estate and residential housing. The station platforms and site of the goods yard survived until the early 1980s.

The approach to the station from Brackley passed in front of a row of cottages on Bridge Street and the trackbed has been taken into their gardens. The bridge carrying the main road over the railway has been demolished and the road now crosses on the level. Elsewhere, the trackbed has been taken into Pocket Farm Walk and a set of steps leading down to the old trackbed can be found at the end of St James Road; the line continues until it is severed by the A43 Brackley bypass.
