= Banbury–Verney Junction branch line =

Former railway branch line in England

Banbury to Verney Junction
Overview
- Locale: Bucks, Northants and Oxon, England
- Dates of operation: 1850–1966
- Successor: Abandoned

Technical
- Track gauge: 4 ft 8 1/2 in (1,435 mm)
- Length: 21.25 miles (34.20 km)

The Banbury to Verney Junction branch line was a railway branch line constructed by the Buckinghamshire Railway which connected the Oxfordshire market town of Banbury with the former Oxford/Cambridge Varsity line and the former Metropolitan Railway at Verney Junction, a distance of 21 miles 39 chains (21.49 mi; 34.58 km). Onward routes from there ran to the West Coast Main Line at Bletchley via Brackley and Buckingham and thence to Cambridge, or to Aylesbury for London.

The line was promoted by the Buckinghamshire Railway which was formed in 1847 to construct two routes: one from Bletchley to Oxford, later known as the Varsity Line, and another to Banbury. The line to Banbury was opened in May 1850 and the Oxford section followed in October of the same year. The line was worked by the London and North Western Railway, which absorbed the Buckinghamshire Railway in 1879. In 1923, the London and North Western became a constituent of the London, Midland and Scottish Railway at the Grouping. The line became part of British Railways upon nationalisation on 1 January 1948. Increasing competition from motor transport and dwindling receipts after the Second World War led to the line being chosen in 1956 for an experiment with British Rail Derby Lightweight diesel multiple units in an attempt to stem the losses. Although the units were well-patronised, the deficit was not reduced sufficiently to justify keeping the line open. The section between Banbury and Buckingham closed on 2 January 1961, with the section Buckingham-Verney Junction abandoned on 5 December 1966. None of the station buildings have survived, although some sections of the line are now public footpaths.

== Authorisation and opening ==
The Buckinghamshire Railway was formed in 1847 to construct a line from Bletchley to Oxford, with a branch to Banbury from Bletchley. The scheme was designed to foil the Great Western Railway's (GWR) attempts to reach Birmingham. The Buckinghamshire Railway was backed by the London and North Western Railway (LNWR) which provided £450,000 (equivalent to £51.9 million in 2023) towards costs. Construction began in July 1847, but financial difficulties meant that the single-track line from Bletchley to Banbury was only completed three years later on 30 March 1850; it opened to passengers on 1 May that year. Goods and coal traffic was accepted from 15 May 1850. The line to Oxford did not open throughout until 20 May 1851 and was later known as the Varsity Line.

The line's northern terminus at Merton Street in Banbury was a modest structure to the east of the GWR's own station. Originally intended as a temporary building, the station's timber construction gave the arriving passenger the feeling of arriving at a frontier and would not have been out of place on the Union Pacific Railroad. Intermediate stations were provided at Farthinghoe, Brackley and Buckingham. Services ran straight through to Bletchley until 1868 when Verney Junction was opened to create an interchange with the Aylesbury and Buckingham Railway.

== Operations ==
=== Passenger traffic ===
The original service provided four up and down trains, all worked by the LNWR, which had leased the line for 999 years from 1 July 1851, finally absorbing it in 1879. Most services from Bletchley to Oxford carried coaches for Banbury, although in some years the service terminated at Brackley. One or two services generally ran on Sundays, but these were not usually part of an Oxford service. From 1905, four services were running from Bletchley to Banbury, with one additional train terminating at Brackley. By 1920, an additional Brackley service had been laid on. Between 1901 and 1916 a through service from Euston operated, which slipped a coach at Bletchley in the down direction. This practice was restored after the 1923 grouping, though initially the coach slipped only ran as far as Buckingham.

Farthinghoe became a junction station on 1 June 1872 with the opening of the Northampton and Banbury Junction Railway, which joined the branch at Cockley Brake and allowed connections to Towcester, Blisworth and Stratford. The 5.5 mi (8.9 km) section from Banbury to Cockley Brake was to become the busiest part of the line. New stations opened at Padbury in March 1878 and Fulwell & Westbury in August 1879.

Passenger traffic was relatively light and peaked just before the First World War, although the LNWR tried to develop with specials and excursion trains. In 1889, a special service ran to Quainton Road from Buckingham upon the death of the third Duke of Buckingham for mourners to attend the funeral at Wotton. Another was operated in 1894 upon the death of the Comte de Paris who had rented Stowe House. Stowe House was later to bring new traffic to the line when it became Stowe School in 1923 and special trains brought the boys to and from the school. In the same year, the LNWR became a constituent of the London, Midland and Scottish Railway upon the railway grouping.

=== Goods traffic ===
Freight consisted mainly of agricultural produce, milk and cattle for Banbury where there was a market next to Merton Street station. Ironstone was also carried from Wroxton via the Oxfordshire Ironstone Railway and the GWR's Banbury station; coal and building materials were also transported.

== Final years ==
=== Decline ===
The single-track branch line from Banbury to Verney Junction possessed none of the strategic advantages of the east–west link between Oxford and Cambridge and even though efforts were made to save it, closure was inevitable. The line's principal objective was Buckingham, which had declined steeply since a disastrous fire in 1725 and the collapse of the wool trade. The first Duke of Buckingham altered the course of Buckingham's history when he opposed the proposed route of the London and Birmingham Railway through the town, with the result that it failed to attract early development and was overtaken by Aylesbury. Neither Buckingham nor Brackley benefited significantly from the railway, and population levels of both remained less than 2,500. Banbury by contrast did expand, but was better served by the GWR's main line from 1852.

Passenger receipts were never high after 1923 and the coming of the motor vehicle had made serious inroads into traffic between the two wars, which was halted by the Second World War. The end of the war saw the railways nationalised and the line becoming part of the London Midland Region of British Railways. With the end of fuel rationing, passenger numbers began to decline again and the line's future was called into question from the mid-1950s after the ASLEF strike of 1955 when much of the milk traffic was lost. Sunday passenger services were withdrawn in the late 1940s and by now only four trains in each direction ran on weekdays. The first threat to the line came in 1952 when BR, having closed the line from Cockley Brake to Towcester from 2 July 1951, reduced services to three trains each way. The demise of the Towcester line resulted in the closure of Farthinghoe on 3 November 1952. By this time, the line was hanging by a thread, with a reported £14,000 annual deficit (equivalent to £440,000 in 2023) and monthly receipts of no more than £50.

=== DMU experiment ===
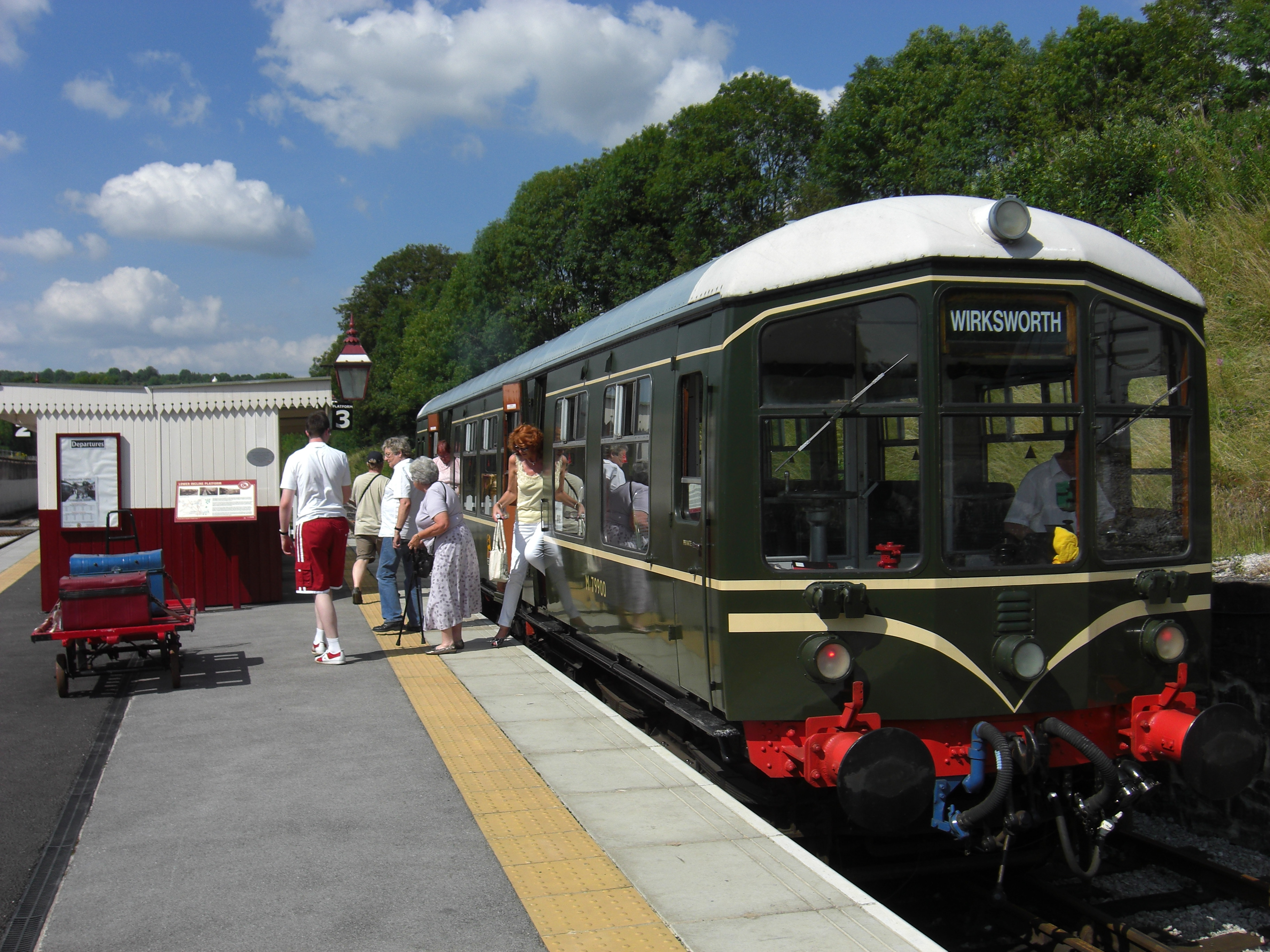
M79900 on the Ecclesbourne Valley Railway

In 1956, the branch was chosen for a pilot single-car diesel multiple unit scheme as part of the Modernisation Plan. Two experimental olive green British Rail Derby Lightweight units nos. M79900 and M79901 entered service on 13 August and operated a service between Banbury and Buckingham, connecting with a steam push-pull service to Bletchley. Eighteen months after their introduction, the need to change at Buckingham was eliminated when the units ran straight through to Bletchley. Two new halts were opened at Radclive and Water Stratford and Merton Street received a facelift. The units, which had a seating capacity of 52 (M79900) and 61 (M79901), resulted in a reported traffic increase of 400%. Such was their popularity that both were operated in tandem on Banbury market days (Thursdays) and Saturdays. In 1958–59, seven up trains and eight down ran on weekdays, with two extra evening services each way on Saturdays. The journey time to Verney Junction was 41 minutes, with a further 17 minutes to Bletchley.

In 1959, British Railways announced that although the units were well-patronised at peak times, they tended to be empty during other periods. There was demand for the service from Buckingham, Fulwell and Westbury and Brackley, and almost none at Banbury where some people thought that the line had already closed. The units had increased passenger receipts by £250-£300 per month and reduced operating costs by £300, but this still resulted in an annual deficit of £4,700 (equivalent to £140,000).

=== Closure ===
Closure notices were published in December 1959 with the final date of service given as 2 January 1960, but this was delayed due to failure to agree subsidy terms with Midland Red which was to provide a replacement bus service. The agreement reached would see two buses a day ply the route: one at 07.25 and the other at 15.31.

The last service between Banbury and Buckingham ran on 31 December 1960, with official closure of the section coming on 2 January 1961. Goods facilities were withdrawn from 2 December 1963 and passenger services on the truncated Buckingham branch continued until 7 September 1964. The line to Buckingham was visited by the Queen on 4 April, when the Royal Train was stabled overnight at Padbury. Her father had previously visited Brackley station in May 1950 en route to the first British Grand Prix at Silverstone. The freight service to Buckingham was withdrawn on 5 December 1966 and the line was abandoned. Track lifting was undertaken in 1967.

== The line today ==
Merton Street was demolished after closure and the site used for road haulage and livestock marketing purposes, before being occupied by a company providing temporary buildings. It is now covered by a residential development. Farthinghoe housed a railwayman until 1963, after which it became derelict and was demolished. No trace remains of the station, the site of which was used as a municipal waste tip by Northamptonshire County Council from 1968, before being closed and reopened by a private company as a recycling and refuse centre; the site comprises a large concrete hangar and a single-storey office and toilet block.

The railway alignment to the west, south and east of the site formerly ran through a shallow cutting which was used as a landfill site in the 1970s and is now part of Farthinghoe Nature Reserve. Just beyond the site to the north, a stone five-arch viaduct has survived. Brackley station was abandoned after closure and after damage by vandals, it was demolished in the 1970s. St. James Road now occupies the site which is surrounded by a light industrial estate and residential housing. Some of the trackbed to the south-east is taken into Pocket Farm Walk before the route is severed by the A43 Brackley Bypass. At Fulwell and Westbury, the ruins of the main station buildings can be seen. The stationhouse is in residential use after having been restored from a derelict state. The station buildings at Buckingham were also demolished after closure and the site taken over by the Countryside Services of Buckinghamshire County Council; the site, including degraded platform remains, was returned to nature and a footpath now runs as far as the location of the goods shed. Padbury station was demolished in 1968 and houses were built on the site in 1975. The line through Verney Junction was mothballed in 1993, leaving the stationmaster's house as a private residence and the platform edges in an overgrown state. As of November 2016, the Government has funded works to reopen the main line between Oxford and Cambridge through Verney Junction (by 2025), but there are no known plans to reopen this branch.

In January 2019, advocacy group the Campaign for Better Transport released a report in which they listed the line as Priority 2 for reopening. Priority 2 is for those lines which require further development or a change in circumstances (such as housing developments).
