= Launton =

Village in Oxfordshire, England

Coordinates: 51.893°N 1.116°W

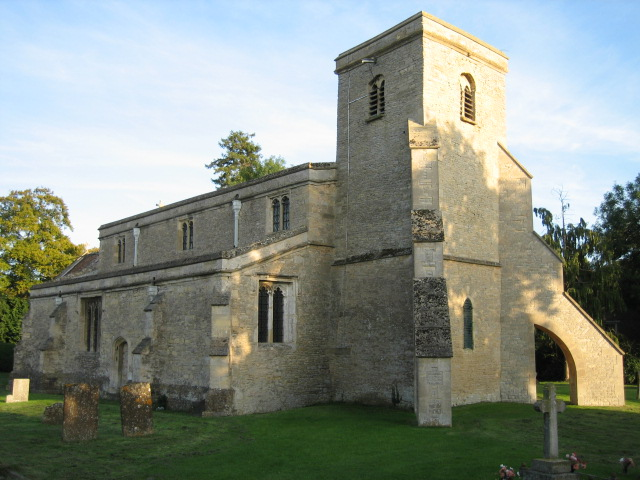
- St Mary's parish church

- Location within Oxfordshire
- Area: 10.49 km^{2} (4.05 sq mi)
- Population: 1,204 (2011 Census)
  - Density: 115/km^{2} (300/sq mi)
- OS grid reference: SP6022
- Civil parish: Launton
- District: Cherwell
- Shire county: Oxfordshire
- Region: South East
- Country: England
- Sovereign state: United Kingdom
- Post town: Bicester
- Postcode district: OX26
- Dialling code: 01869
- Police: Thames Valley
- Fire: Oxfordshire
- Ambulance: South Central
- UK Parliament: Bicester and Woodstock
- Website: Launton Village Website

Launton is a village and civil parish on the eastern outskirts of Bicester, Oxfordshire, England. The 2011 Census recorded the parish's population as 1,204.

== Manor ==
King Edward the Confessor granted the manor of Launton to Westminster Abbey in 1065. The abbey surrendered the manor to the Crown when it was suppressed in the Dissolution of the Monasteries in 1540, but in 1542 the Crown granted Launton to the abbey's Dean and Chapter. Mary I restored the Roman Catholic church in England so in 1556 Launton was surrendered to the Crown, who restored it to the reinstated abbott and convent of Westminster. Elizabeth I restored the English Reformation so in 1560 Launton was surrendered to the Crown for a third time, who again granted it to the Dean and Chapter. In 1649 the Commonwealth of England assigned Launton to Westminster School. In 1860 the lands of the Dean and Chapter of Westminster were vested in the Ecclesiastical Commissioners.

The present manor house is 17th-century, with a court room that was re-ordered in the 19th century. Its farmyard has a 14th- or 15th-century barn of 10 bays with 17th-century roof timbers. The barn may have been a tithe barn and now forms the centrepiece of a wedding venue called 'The Tythe Barn' after being restored in 1997. It is now a Grade II* listed building.

== Church and chapels ==
=== Church of England ===
The Church of England parish church of the Assumption of the Blesséd Virgin Mary was built in the 12th century, and the four-bay aisles of its nave were added in the 13th century. Sources disagree as to whether the west tower is part of the original 12th-century church or a 13th-century addition. Originally the chancel had an apse, but in the 15th century this part of the church was reordered with a rectangular east end. The nave has a clerestory with 15th- or 16th-century windows. Some of the windows of the aisles are 16th-century.

In 1891 a pair of flying buttresses designed by Reginald Blomfield was added to the west tower. In 1910 an Arts and Crafts-style screen designed by John Oldrid Scott was added to the south aisle. The church is Grade I listed.

The bell tower has a ring of six bells, all cast by Gillett & Johnston of Croydon in 1907. The church also has a Sanctus bell that was cast in 1352.

In the churchyard are the base and broken shaft of a 14th- or 15th-century stone churchyard cross.

The ecclesiastical parish is now part of the Benefice of Bicester, Bucknell, Caversfield and Launton.

=== Presbyterian chapel ===
Launton had a Presbyterian congregation by 1772, when a meeting house was licensed for it. The congregation lapsed by about 1800, but was re-established by 1806. In 1807 Zion chapel was built for it on the western edge of the village. Later in the 19th century the chapel was used as a school.

=== Congregational chapel ===
Bethel chapel was built in 1850 for an independent Nonconformist congregation. By 1855 it had a lending library and a school. It later joined the Congregational Church.

== Economic history ==
The Varsity Line between Bletchley and Oxford via Bicester Town was built through Launton parish and opened in 1851. Launton railway station served the village until the end of 1967, when British Railways withdrew passenger services between Bletchley and Oxford.

== Amenities ==
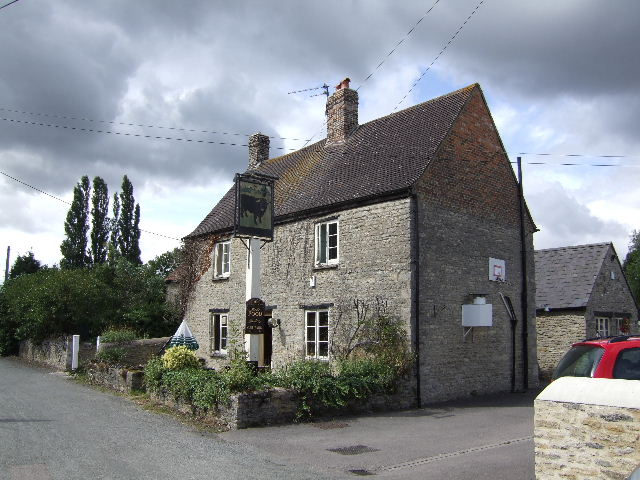
The Black Bull, renamed in 2020 to The Launton Arms

Launton has two public houses: The Bull Inn at the crossroads in the centre of the village and The Launton Arms (formerly The Black Bull) at West End. The village has also a post office, two shops and a hair salon.

Launton has a Church of England primary school. The school has links with the parish church including Christingle and Year Six leavers services.

Launton has a Parish Hall. The Sports and Social Club provides the home pitch for Launton Football Club, plus a tennis court and small children's play area.

The Launton Village Players is an amateur theatre group living in and around Launton who perform an annual pantomime at The Cooper School in Bicester, and musical shows and plays in the village.

The village has a Woods on your Doorstep at Island Pond Wood, managed by The Woodland Trust. Villagers bought it by public subscription and planted it in 1999.

Launton has a Non-League football club, Launton Sports F.C., which plays at Launton Sports Club on Bicester Road.

== Buses ==
Stagecoach in Oxfordshire bus route 28 links Launton with Bicester. Buses run hourly, Monday to Saturday. There is no service on Sunday or on public holidays.

In school terms, coaches to and from Blessed George Napier Roman Catholic School in Banbury also serve Launton.

== Twinning ==
Launton is twinned with the village of Gavray in the Lower Normandy region of France.

== Sources and further reading ==
- Lobel, Mary D, ed. (1959). A History of the County of Oxford. Victoria County History. Vol. 6: Ploughley Hundred. London: Oxford University Press for the Institute of Historical Research. pp. 232–243.
- Marples, BJ (1973). "The Medieval Crosses of Oxfordshire" (PDF). Oxoniensia. XXXVIII. Oxfordshire Architectural and Historical Society: 299–311. ISSN 0308-5562.
- Sherwood, Jennifer; Pevsner, Nikolaus (1974). Oxfordshire. The Buildings of England. Harmondsworth: Penguin Books. pp. 681–682. ISBN 0-14-071045-0.
