= Marsh Gibbon and Poundon railway station =

Disused railway station in Buckinghamshire, England

Coordinates: 51.9163°N 1.0552°W

Marsh Gibbon and Poundon
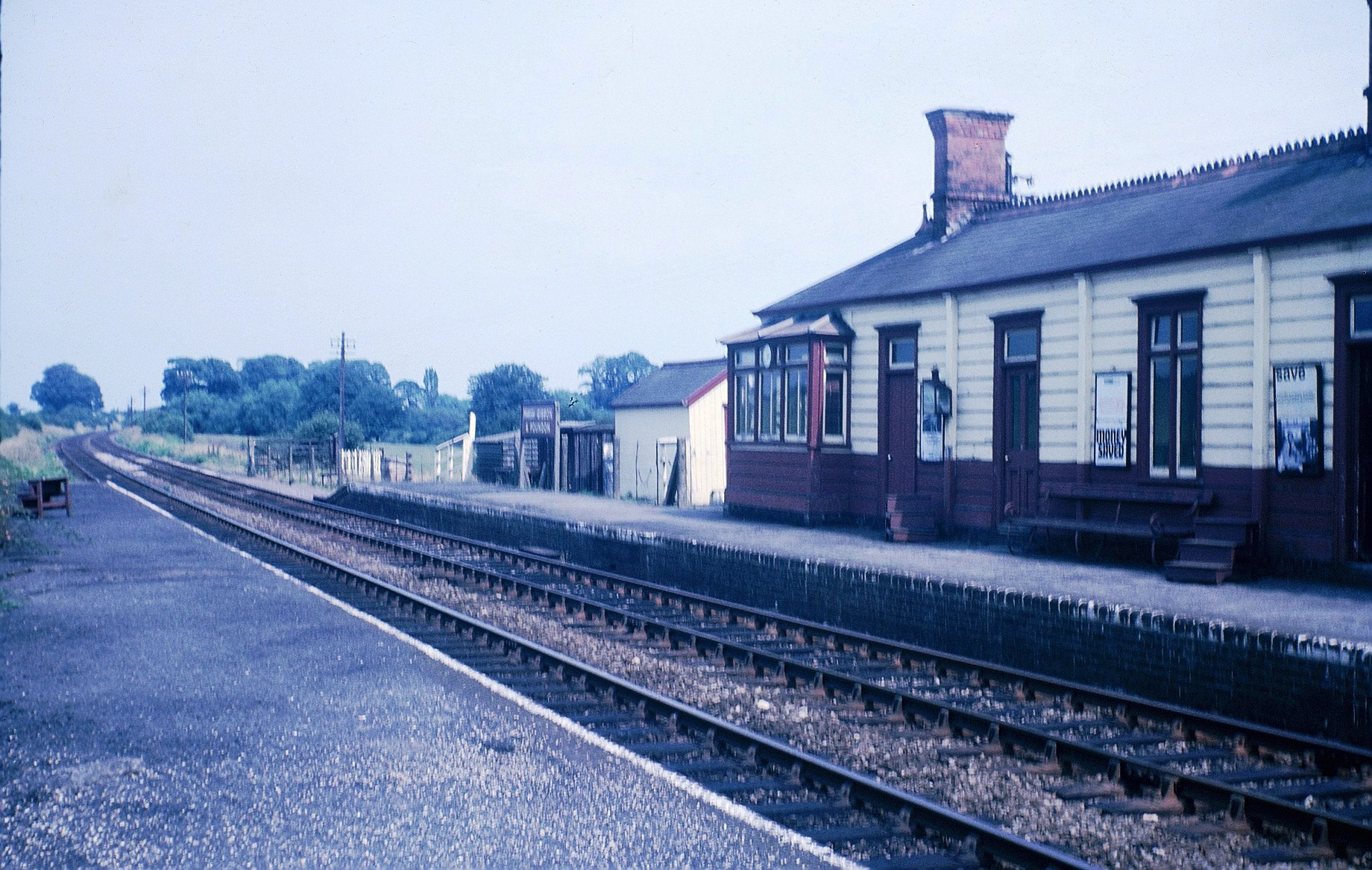
- Station in 1967.

General information
- Location: Marsh Gibbon, Buckinghamshire; England
- Grid reference: SP651246
- Platforms: 2

Other information
- Status: Disused

History
- Original company: LNWR
- Pre-grouping: LNWR
- Post-grouping: LMS

Key dates
- 7 August 1880: Station opens
- 1 January 1968: Station closes
Location

Marsh Gibbon and Poundon railway station was a railway station to the west of Verney Junction on the Oxford and Bletchley section of the LNWR's branch of what is now known as the Varsity Line.

== History ==
The line was opened in 1850–51 with a station at Launton some 2 miles (3.2 km) away. The original intention had been to call this station Poundon Bridge, however the name never seems to have been used. Marsh Gibbon and Poundon opened on 7 August 1880.

The era of extravagantly designed and built country stations had long passed, and what was provided were simple but practical timber buildings without awnings. Oddly the station still retained the low platforms of earlier stations on the line. Even though there were proposals to raise them in the early 20th century, they remained until closure. Small moveable steps had to be provided to allow passengers to board and alight easily.

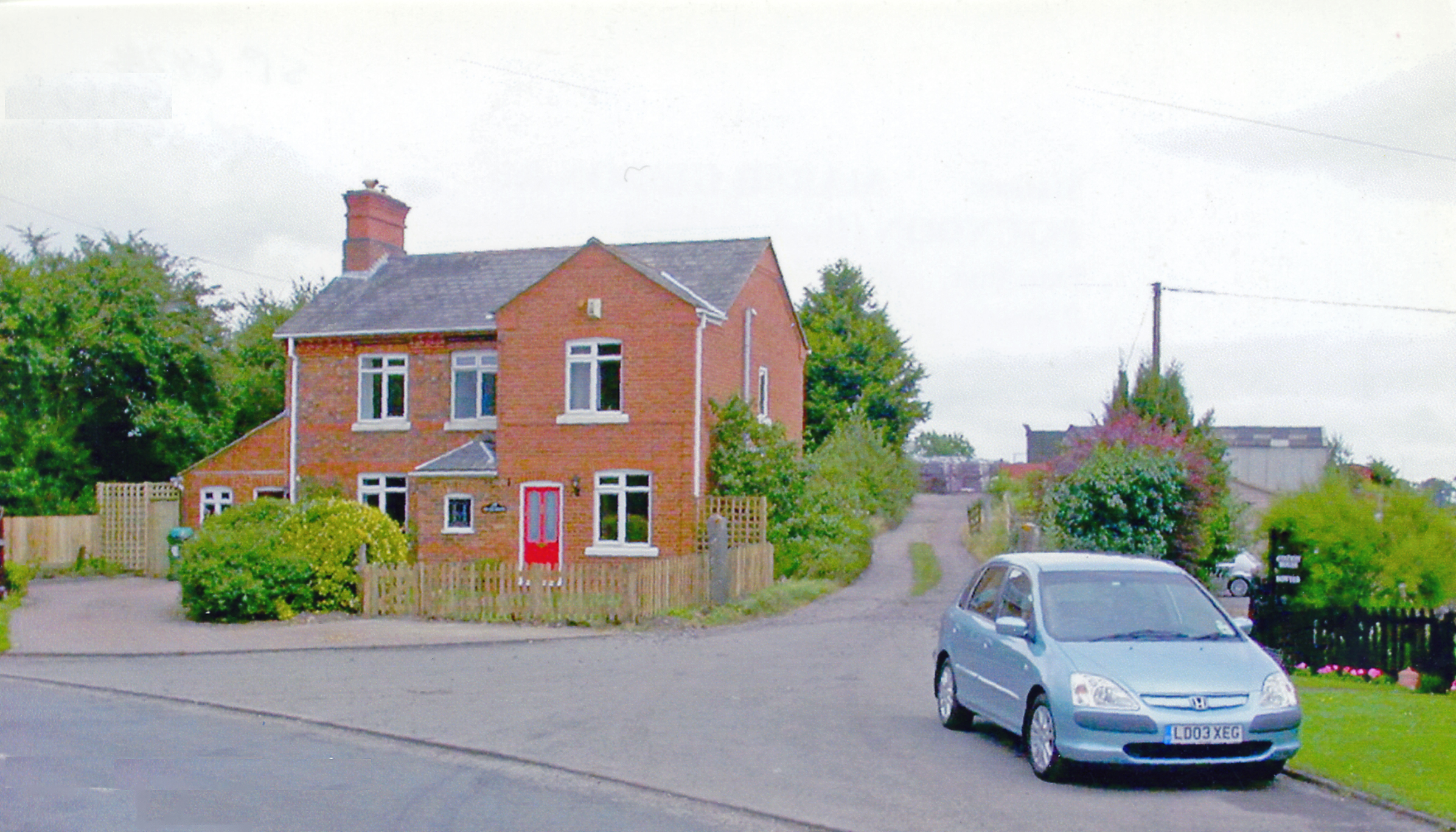
Station house in 2007.

Another feature was the bay window in the main building which was on the down Oxford platform. This projected out onto the platform since it was the signal box. There was a clock in the centre which was visible on the platforms as required by the Board of Trade. There was a small waiting shed on the up Bletchley-bound platform, and a single siding off the down, running at an angle in front of the main building

At grouping in 1923 it became part of the London Midland and Scottish Railway; it duly passed to British Railways in 1948, as part of the London Midland Region. Diesel trains were provided for passenger services from 2 November 1959. The station stopped handling goods traffic on 2 November 1964; the signalbox was closed in January 1965 and passenger services were withdrawn when the whole of the route from Bletchley to Oxford closed on 1 January 1968. The station was demolished within a year after closure.

== Routes ==
Preceding station	Disused railways	Following station
Launton; Line and station closed	London and North Western Railway; Varsity Line	Claydon; Line and station closed
