= Claydon railway station =

Disused railway station in Buckinghamshire, England

Coordinates: 51.93069°N 0.96880°W

Claydon
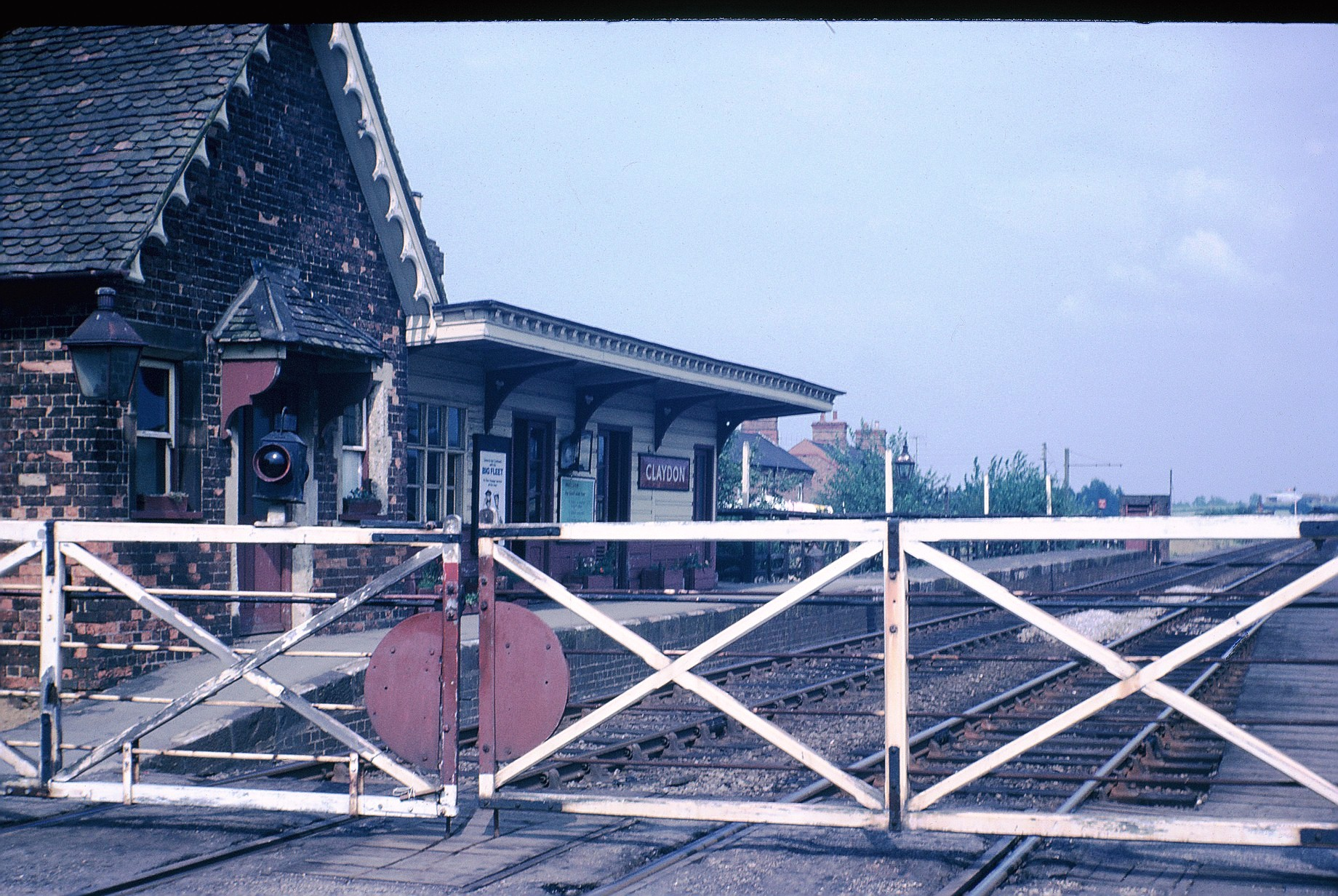
- Station in 1967.

General information
- Location: Steeple Claydon, Buckinghamshire; England
- Grid reference: SP710263
- Platforms: 2

Other information
- Status: Disused

History
- Original company: Buckinghamshire Railway
- Pre-grouping: London and North Western Railway
- Post-grouping: London, Midland and Scottish Railway; London Midland Region of British Railways

Key dates
- 1 May 1850: Opened
- 6 January 1964: Closed to goods traffic
- 1 January 1968: Closed to passengers
Location

Claydon railway station is a former railway station on the 'Varsity Line' (former Oxford – Cambridge line), that served the village of Steeple Claydon in Buckinghamshire.

== History ==
Claydon was opened by the Buckinghamshire Railway on 1 May 1850 as part of its line from Banbury to Bletchley. The line was worked from the outset by the London and North Western Railway (LNWR) which absorbed the Buckinghamshire Railway in 1879. The line was subsequently extended westwards to Islip, to a temporary station at Banbury Road and then to Oxford, opening throughout on 20 May 1851. Claydon station was situated at the 11 milepost on the eastern side of a level crossing where the road from Steeple Claydon to Middle Claydon crosses the line. The station's name came from the fact that the location is surrounded by places with "Claydon" in their name, such as Botolph Claydon and East Claydon, as well as Claydon House which was the residence of Sir Harry Verney, one of the founders of the Buckinghamshire Railway. The nearest village was Steeple Claydon whose inhabitants also had the choice of Padbury railway station on the Banbury to Verney Junction Branch Line which was about 2 miles (3.2 km) away.

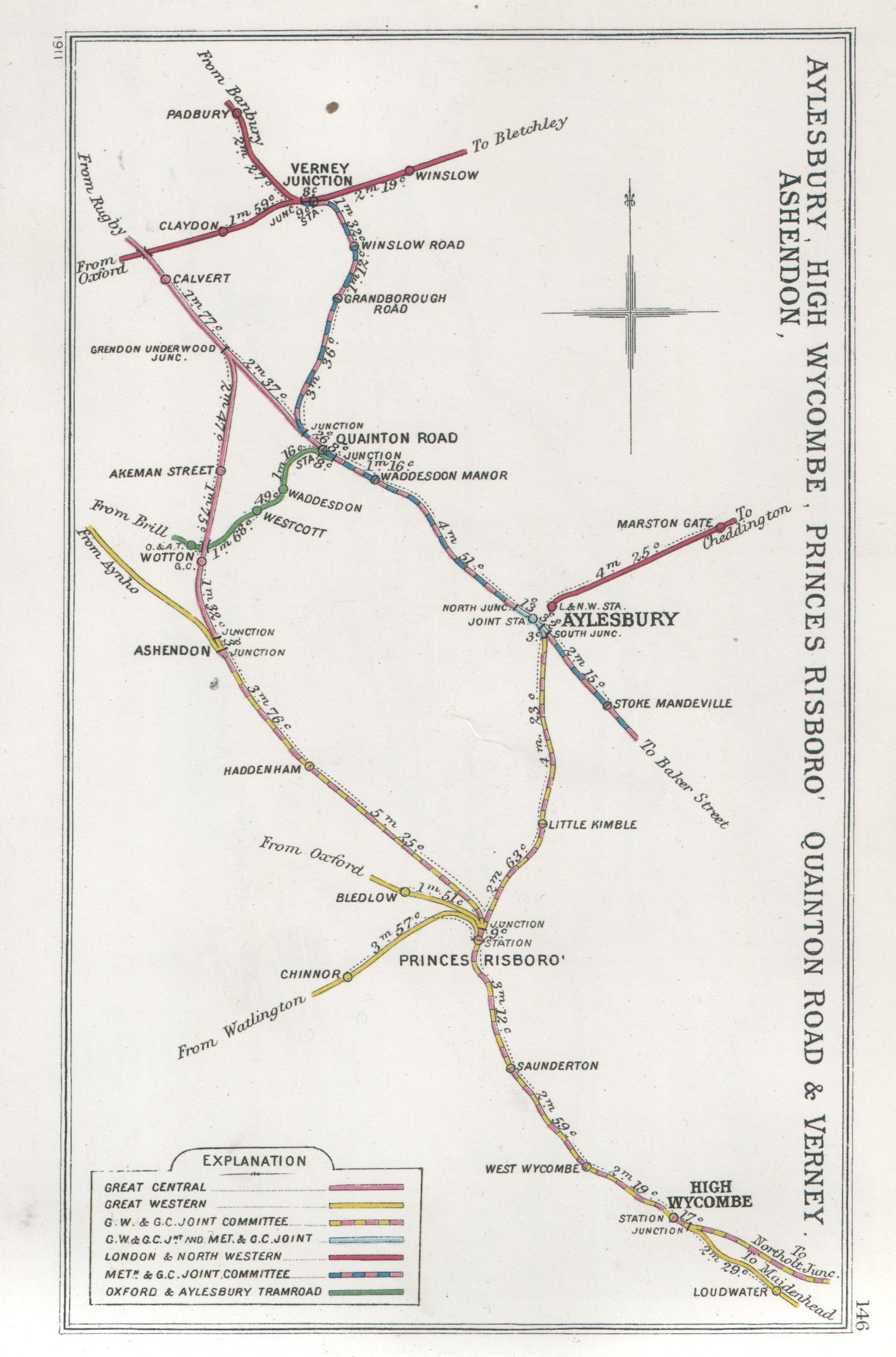
A 1911 Railway Clearing House map of railways in the vicinity of Claydon. The chord to Calvert was added after this map was drawn.

The cost of the station was £1,000 in respect of building work plus £200 for machinery. Two platforms were provided with the station buildings on the "Up" side and a timber platform and waiting shelter on the "Down" side. The stone "Up" platform was very low and also very narrow. The architecture was a rural combination of brick and timber with some restrained ornamentation. The station house which adjoined the platform buildings was in a similar style to structures on the Bletchley to Bedford section of the line, being built of brick and half timber rendered with cement and decorative barge boarding around the gables. A small goods yard was served by two sidings and comprised a loading dock, weighbridge, brick hut, ground frame and loading gauge. The level crossing gate and sidings were controlled by Annett's key; when the siding was in use it could only be released by a key which was kept in a gable wing of the station building. During London, Midland and Scottish Railway days, the station, which was in a relatively rural location, was served by six services in either direction on weekdays, plus an extra service on Saturdays and three services on Sundays. When the stationmaster at Claydon was abolished, two porter signalmen ran the station on alternate shifts.

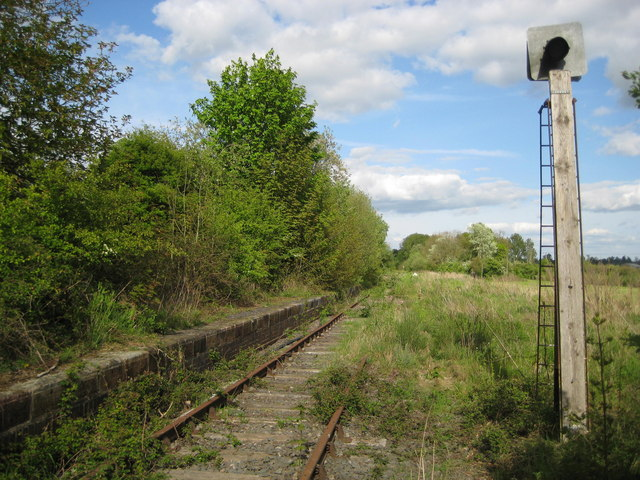
Station remains in 2009.

In the wake of the abandonment of a plan to develop the Varsity Line as a freight link from the East Coast ports to South Wales, including a marshalling yard near Swanbourne, Claydon station was listed for closure in the Beeching report which called for the closure of all minor stations on the line. It closed to goods traffic on 6 January 1964 and to passengers on 1 January 1968.

== Claydon LNE Junction ==
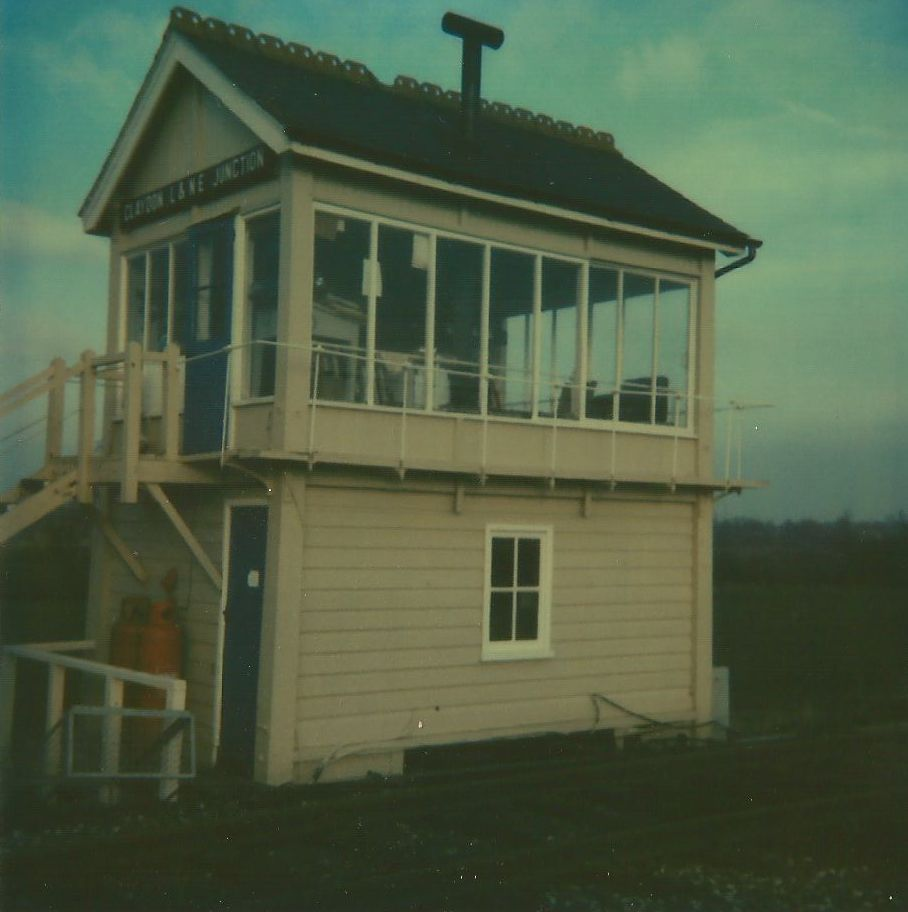
The exterior of the LNE signal box in c. 1984

An east-to-south chord between the Great Central Main Line and the Oxford to Bletchley line and was opened on 7 July 1940. Situated about 3 kilometres (1.9 mi) west of Claydon station and 1 kilometre (0.62 mi) north of Calvert railway station at grid reference SP684255, it was initially double-track but later singled in 1985. The chord was intended to give added flexibility if bombing disrupted services elsewhere and allowed through working between Bletchley and Aylesbury without the need to reverse at Verney Junction. In the event, the spur never supported a regular passenger service but became a useful route for freight and parcels workings, especially services to Calvert brickworks and trains on diversion such as nighttime sleepers which were sent to Marylebone during the electrification of the West Coast Main Line, as well as shoppers' specials from Aylesbury to Milton Keynes and movements of empty DMU stock between the Chiltern Main Line and Bletchley maintenance depot. On 2 May 1964, the Midland Pullman worked a 1964 FA Cup Final special via the spur and, for a time, fish trains were reversed down the Great Central here and routed via Bicester London Road and Oxford.

The chord was controlled by an LNWR signal box named "Claydon LNE Junction" on the Oxford to Bletchley line and there was an 18-lever Great Central box named "Calvert North Junction" on the Great Central Main Line. The Great Central box closed on 9 September 1956 and the LNWR box followed on 10 December 1967. The spur was mothballed in May 1993 but was brought back into use not long afterwards to allow Bristol "Binliner" trains to access the clay pits at the former brickworks which are now used as landfill sites. When the track was singled in 1985, a loop was provided at Claydon to allow trains to work between Aylesbury and Oxford without having to run round at Bletchley. The track here is the furthest point north from Marylebone at which Great Central tracks remain in place, services to the north of Calvert having been withdrawn on 5 September 1966 and the track lifted soon afterwards.

== Present and future ==
=== Present day ===
The remains of Claydon's station buildings were demolished in the mid-1980s at about the same time as the buildings at Launton. The "Up" platform has nevertheless survived in an overgrown state and railway cottages built for employees also remain. The level crossing gates were replaced by an automatic open crossing in 1976.

Claydon LNE junction is still used for binliner (containerised domestic waste) and spoil trains for the landfill site at Calvert and empty coaching stock movements. In 2007, four loaded domestic waste services ran daily to Calvert from Cricklewood, Dagenham, Bristol and Northolt. Claydon LNE signal box is now preserved on the Swindon and Cricklade Railway.

=== Future & Possible Reopening ===
The approval in Autumn 2012 of the western section of the East West Rail project was to see the line through Claydon reopened by 2017, but the project is substantially delayed. As of December 2017 there are no proposals that include the reopening of Claydon station.

The preferred route for High Speed 2 would see the high-speed line running parallel to the East West Rail between Quainton Road and Claydon. It is proposed to construct an infrastructure maintenance depot between Calvert and Steeple Claydon within the chord linking the former Great Central Main Line and the reinstated Oxford to Bletchley line. The depot would provide the facilities for railborne maintenance equipment needed to service the line. The preferred site, called 'Thame Road', and a fall-back site, 'Great Pond' were announced in December 2010. The nearby Calvert Waste Plant has also been identified for heat and power generation.

In October 2014, it was reported that Network Rail were considering making passive provision for a station in Queen Catherine Road to serve Steeple Claydon as well as the HS2 infrastructure depot. In July 2015, it was reported that the station's reopening looked more possible according to a County Council report which suggested a stop back in 2012. 60,000 journeys could be made from the station and reduce impact on the roads while HS2 was under construction. The passive provision was secured at this site, meaning that a station can be built at a later date.

In February 2017, the local MP called for the station to be built at the junction between East West Rail and the HS2 line, serving both lines.

| Preceding station | Disused railways | Following station |
|---|---|---|
| Marsh Gibbon and Poundon; Line and station closed | London and North Western Railway; Varsity Line | Verney Junction; Line and station closed |
