= Cooper School, Bicester =

Secondary school in Oxfordshire, England

The Cooper School

Location
- Churchill Road; Bicester, Oxfordshire, OX26 4RS; England; 51°54′29″N 1°08′42″W

Information
- Type: Secondary
- Motto: "Dream big, work hard, be kind"
- Established: 1988
- Department for Education URN: 141069 Tables
- Ofsted: Reports
- Chairman of Governors: Lucy Katz
- Head teacher: Charlotte Broom
- Gender: Multi-gender
- Age: 11 to 18
- Enrolment: 1188
- Capacity: 1333
- Colours: Black, Blue, Gold
- Website: thecooperschool.co.uk

The Cooper School is a co-educational secondary school and sixth form with academy status, located in the northern side of Bicester, Oxfordshire.

== History ==
Previously a community school administered by Oxfordshire County Council, the school became a specialist science college in 2005. The Cooper School converted to academy status on 1 July 2014 within Bernwode Schools Trust, however, the school continues to coordinate with Oxfordshire County Council for admissions. The school joined the Acer trust in January 2024.

The Cooper School is currently rated 'Requires improvement' by Ofsted after an inspection in November 2022.

== Catchment area ==
Most of its students come from the north and east of Bicester and surrounding villages which include, amongst others, Charlton-on-Otmoor, Launton, Finmere, Fringford, Stratton Audley, Piddington and Hethe.

== The Sixth Form ==
In 2011 a new sixth-form building, called the Post 16 Centre, was constructed and opened to students in September of the same year. The current head of sixth form at The Cooper School is Jennifer Post, and there are currently over 200 students in Years 12 and 13.

== Past headteachers ==
- Keith McClellan [January 1988 – August 2000]
- Andrew Hamilton [September 2000 - August 2005]
- Ben Baxter [September 2005 - December 2020]
- Robert Whannel [December 2020 - March 2026]
- Nathan Thomas (Interim) [March 2026 - June 2026]

== Past Chairs of Governors ==
- Michael Waine []
