= Sourdeval-les-Bois =

- Part of Gavray-sur-Sienne
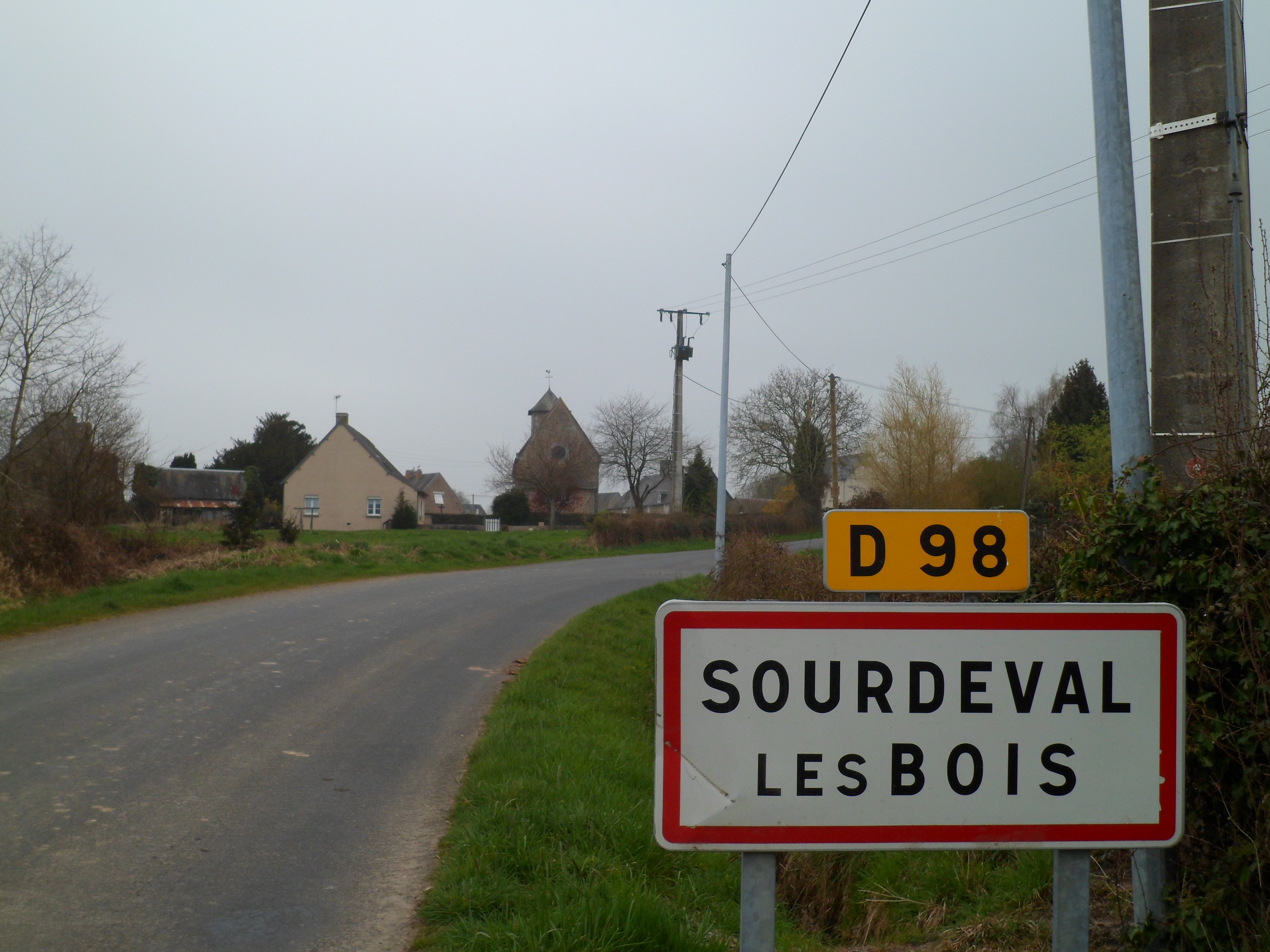
- Location of Sourdeval-les-Bois
- Location within France Location within Normandy
- Coordinates: 48°54′39″N 1°15′49″W
- Country: France
- Region: Normandy
- Department: Manche
- Arrondissement: Coutances
- Canton: Quettreville-sur-Sienne
- Commune: Gavray-sur-Sienne
- Area^{1}: 5.86 km^{2} (2.26 sq mi)
- Elevation: 91 m (299 ft)
- Highest elevation: 184 m (604 ft)
- Lowest elevation: 55 m (180 ft)
- Population (2022): 227
  - Density: 38.7/km^{2} (100/sq mi)
- Time zone: UTC+01:00 (CET)
  - Summer (DST): UTC+02:00 (CEST)
- Postal code: 50450
- ^{1} French Land Register data, which excludes lakes, ponds, glaciers > 1 km^{2} (0.386 sq mi or 247 acres) and river estuaries.

Sourdeval-les-Bois (French pronunciation: [suʁdəval le bwa]) is a former commune in the Manche department in Normandy in north-western France. On 1 January 2019, it was merged into the new commune Gavray-sur-Sienne.

== See also ==
- Communes of the Manche department
