= Launton railway station =

Disused railway station in Oxfordshire, England

Coordinates: 51.9071°N 1.1022°W

Launton
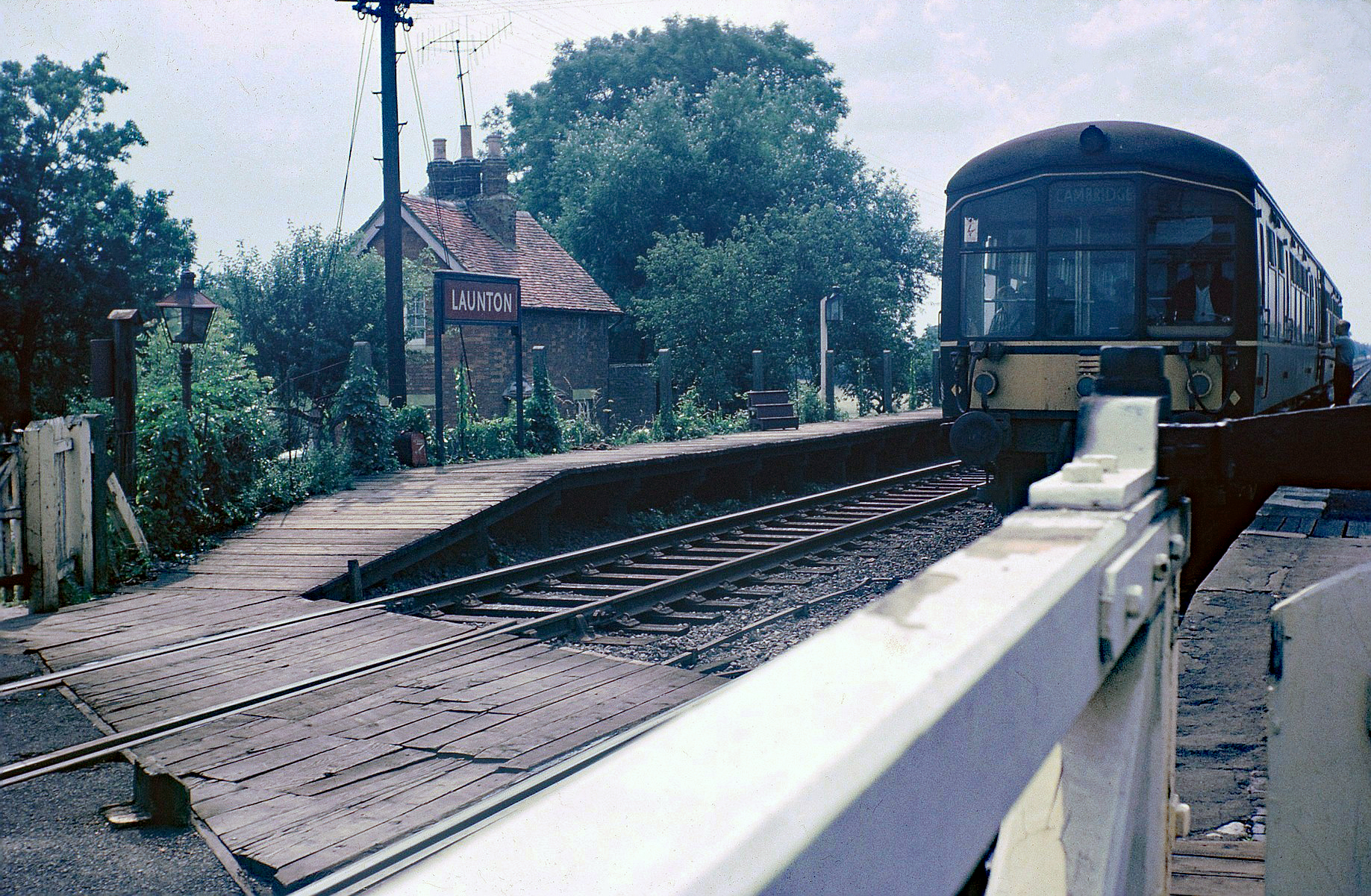
- DMU departs from station in 1967.

General information
- Location: Launton, Cherwell; England
- Grid reference: SP618235
- Platforms: 2

Other information
- Status: Disused

History
- Original company: Buckinghamshire Railway
- Pre-grouping: London and North Western Railway
- Post-grouping: London Midland and Scottish Railway

Key dates
- October 1850: Opened
- 1 January 1968: Closed
Location

Launton railway station served the village of Launton in Oxfordshire. It was on the Varsity Line between Bletchley and Oxford. The station opened in 1850; British Railways closed Launton station, and withdrew passenger services at the end of 1967. The station was demolished after closure but the platforms remained until around 2020 when they were removed during reconstruction for reopening of the East/West Rail Link.

== Routes ==
| Preceding station | Disused railways | Following station |
|---|---|---|
| Bicester London Road; Line closed, station open | London and North Western Railway; Varsity Line | Marsh Gibbon and Poundon; Line and station closed |
