= Gavray-sur-Sienne =

- Commune
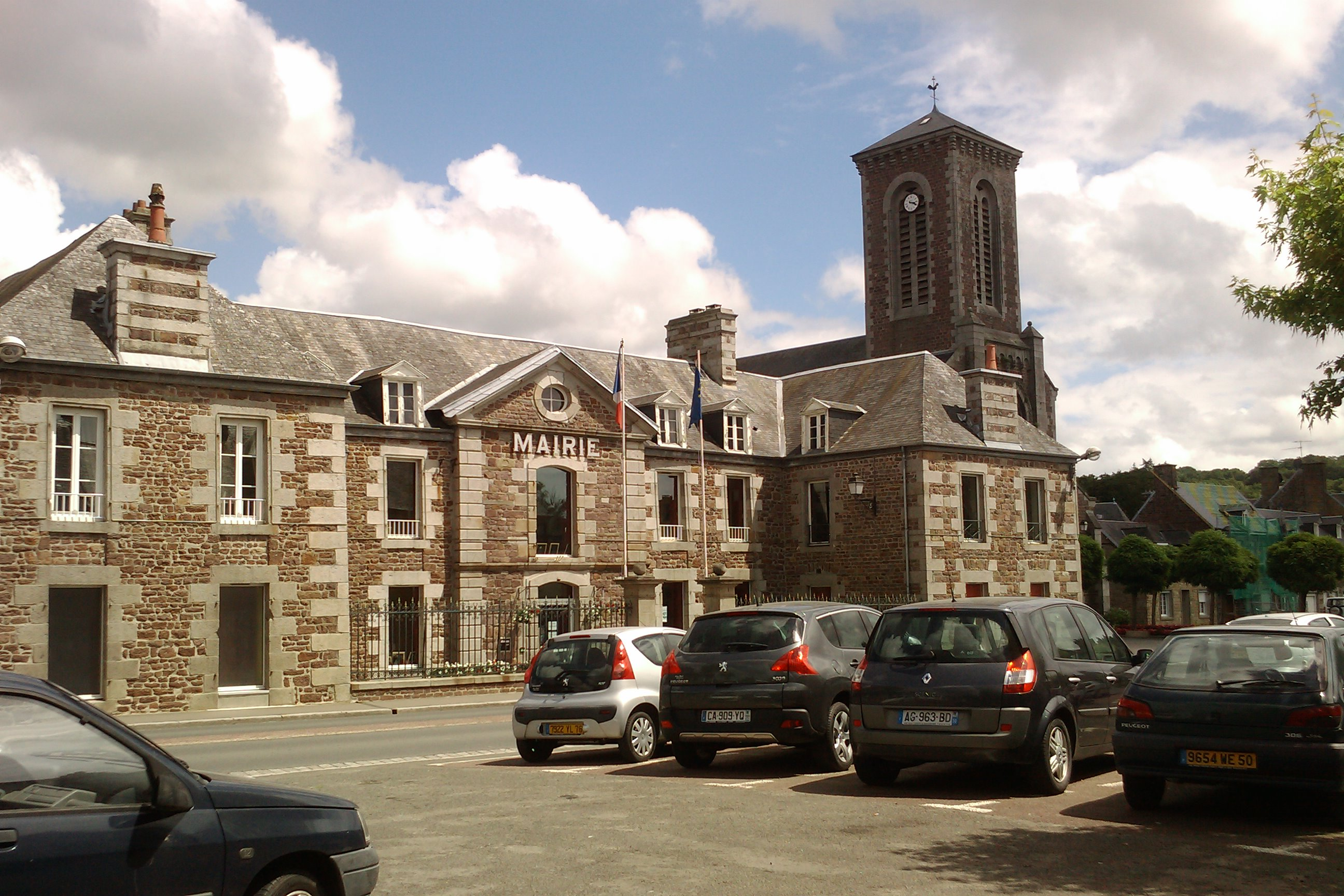
- The town hall in the center of Gavray
- Location of Gavray-sur-Sienne
- Location within France Location within Normandy
- Coordinates: 48°54′38″N 1°20′56″W
- Country: France
- Region: Normandy
- Department: Manche
- Arrondissement: Coutances
- Canton: Quettreville-sur-Sienne
- Intercommunality: Coutances Mer et Bocage
- Area^{1}: 38.02 km^{2} (14.68 sq mi)
- Highest elevation: 186 m (610 ft)
- Lowest elevation: 24 m (79 ft)
- Population (2023): 2,047
  - Density: 53.84/km^{2} (139.4/sq mi)
- Time zone: UTC+01:00 (CET)
  - Summer (DST): UTC+02:00 (CEST)
- INSEE/Postal code: 50197 /50450
- Website: www.gavray.fr
- ^{1} French Land Register data, which excludes lakes, ponds, glaciers > 1 km^{2} (0.386 sq mi or 247 acres) and river estuaries.

Gavray-sur-Sienne (French pronunciation: [ɡavʁɛ syʁ sjɛn]) is a commune in the Manche department in north-western France. It was established on 1 January 2019 by merger of the former communes of Gavray (the seat), Le Mesnil-Amand, Le Mesnil-Rogues and Sourdeval-les-Bois.

== Population ==
Population data refer to the area corresponding with the commune as of January 2025.

Historical population
Year	Pop.	±% p.a.
1968	1,977	—
1975	1,906	−0.52%
1982	1,912	+0.04%
1990	1,935	+0.15%
1999	1,949	+0.08%
2007	1,840	−0.72%
2012	1,988	+1.56%
2017	1,966	−0.22%
2023	2,047	+0.68%
Source: INSEE

== See also ==
- Communes of the Manche department
