= Gavray =

Commune in Manche, France

- Part of Gavray-sur-Sienne
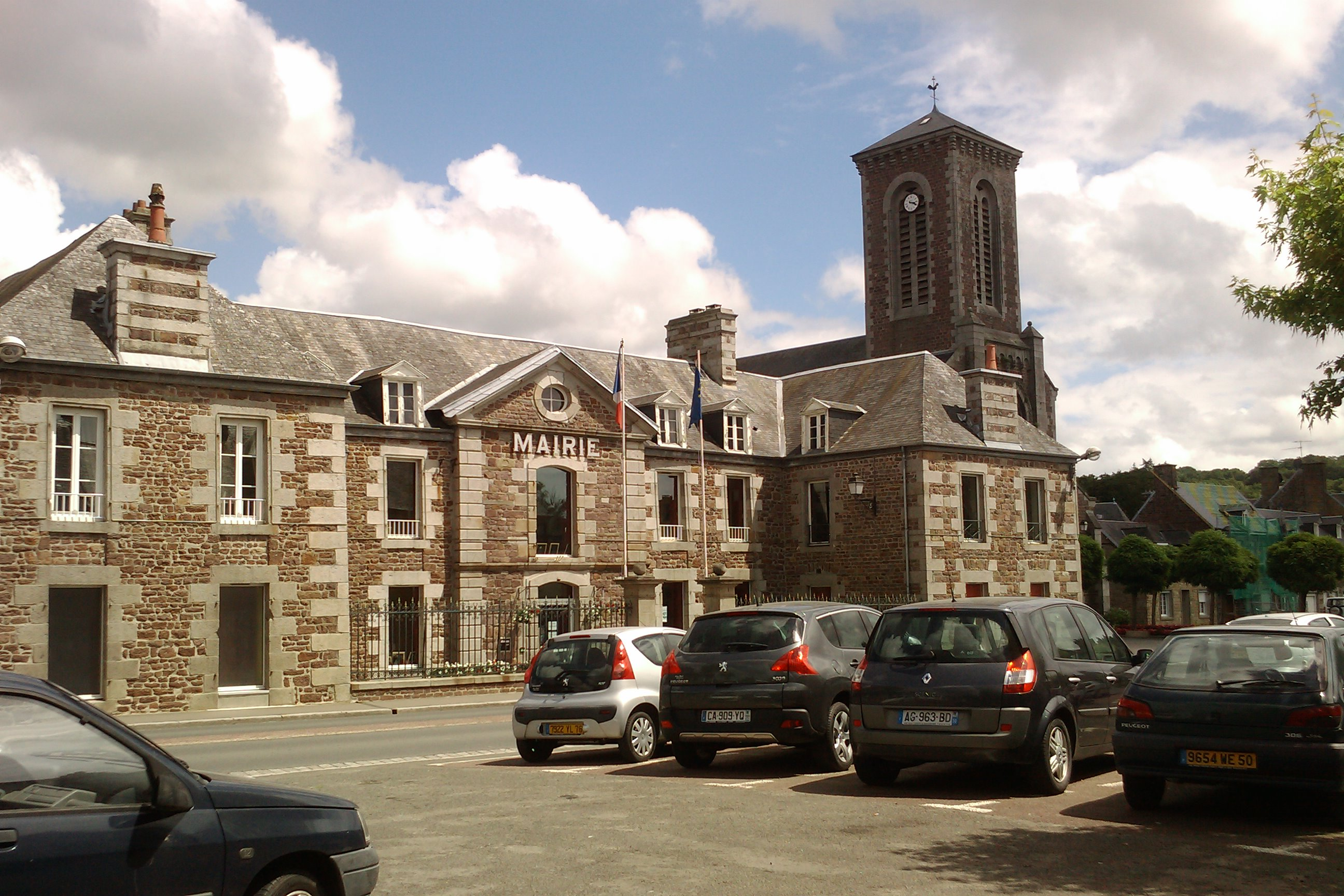
- The town hall in the center of Gavray
- Location of Gavray
- Location within France Location within Normandy
- Coordinates: 48°54′38″N 1°20′56″W
- Country: France
- Region: Normandy
- Department: Manche
- Arrondissement: Coutances
- Canton: Quettreville-sur-Sienne
- Commune: Gavray-sur-Sienne
- Area^{1}: 20.60 km^{2} (7.95 sq mi)
- Elevation: 34 m (112 ft)
- Highest elevation: 186 m (610 ft)
- Lowest elevation: 24 m (79 ft)
- Population (2022): 1,442
  - Density: 70.00/km^{2} (181.3/sq mi)
- Time zone: UTC+01:00 (CET)
  - Summer (DST): UTC+02:00 (CEST)
- Postal code: 50450
- Website: www.gavray.fr
- ^{1} French Land Register data, which excludes lakes, ponds, glaciers > 1 km^{2} (0.386 sq mi or 247 acres) and river estuaries.

Gavray (French pronunciation: [ɡavʁɛ]) is a former commune in the Manche department in north-western France. On 1 January 2019, it was merged into the new commune Gavray-sur-Sienne.

== See also ==
- Communes of the Manche department
