= Varsity Line =

Oxford–Cambridge railway (1845–1967)

Coordinates: 51.968°N 0.818°W

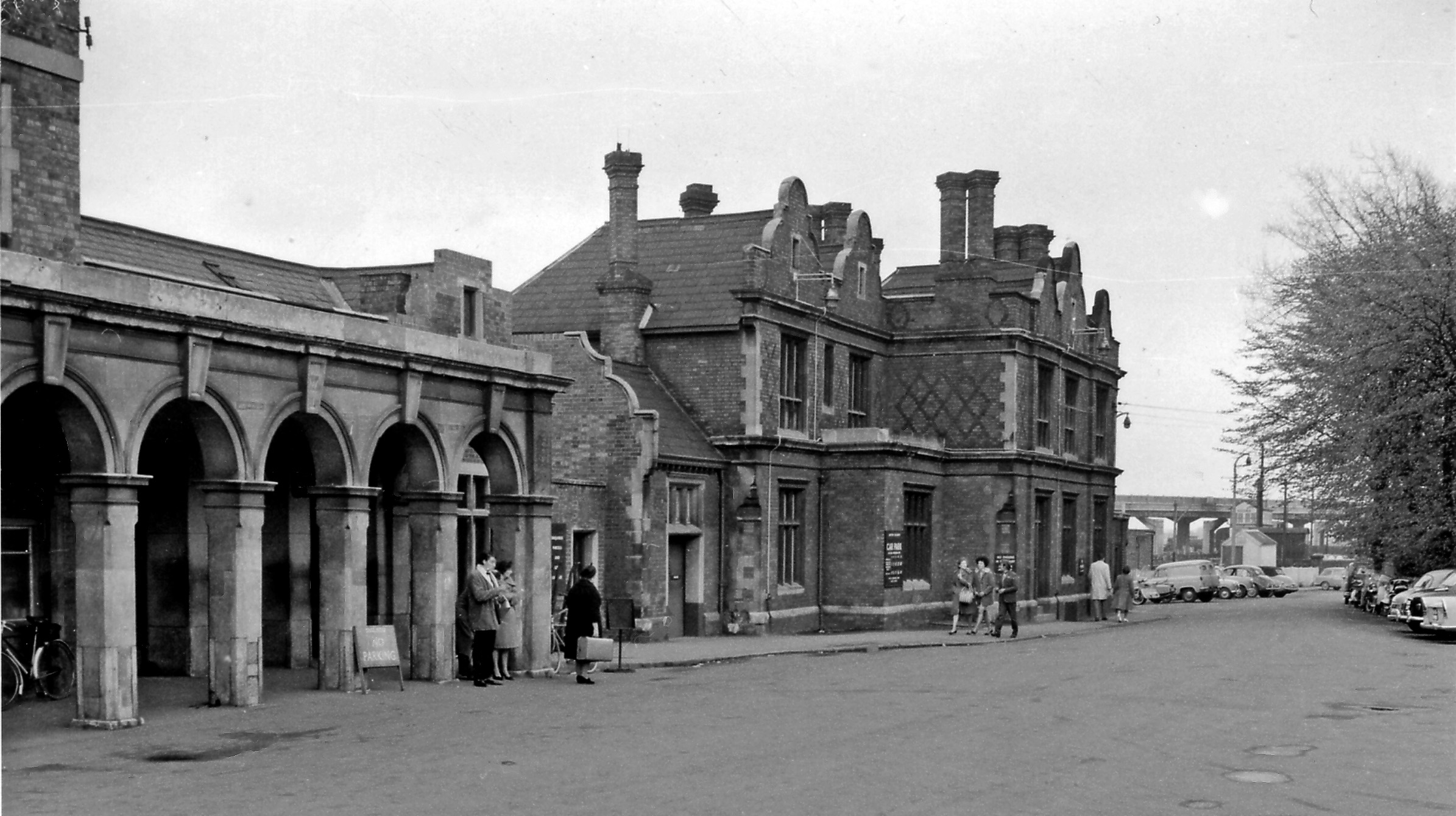
- Bletchley station, at the midpoint of the line, in 1962

Overview
- Status: see East West Rail
- Owner: Network Rail
- Locale: South East England
- Termini: Oxford; Cambridge
- Stations: 13 open 2 planned

Service
- Type: Heavy rail
- System: National Rail
- Operator(s): Chiltern Railways (Oxford–Bicester); West Midlands Trains (Bletchley–Bedford)

History
- Opened: 1846–1851
- Closed: 1968: Bedford to Cambridge; Oxford–Bletchley (to passengers); 1993: mothballed Claydon Junction–Bletchley (to all traffic)

Technical
- Num of tracks: 1–2
- Track gauge: 1,435 mm (4 ft 8 1/2 in) standard gauge

The Varsity Line was the main railway line that linked the English university cities of Oxford and Cambridge, operated by the London and North Western Railway.

In World War II, the line became a strategic route for freight avoiding London, and additional connections were made to nearby lines to improve it, but it was not greatly used for its intended purpose. After the war, the line was again scheduled to be developed as a strategic route, but that scheme was never fully implemented either.

Passenger services were withdrawn from most of the line on 1 January 1968, and only the Bletchley–Bedford section (the Marston Vale line) remained open for passenger traffic.

In 1987, the section between Oxford and Bicester was reopened, followed in 2015 by a connection to the Chiltern Main Line at Bicester, enabling Chiltern Railways to operate an Oxford to London passenger service. The section between Bicester and Bletchley has been rebuilt and was made ready for use in October 2025 but, as of November 2026, passenger services have yet to commence and the line is only being used for freight. There are funded plans for the entire line to be re-established by the late 2030s, partly on a new route and under a new name – "East West Rail" (or possibly "East West Main Line").

== Early history ==
The Oxford to Cambridge line, when completed, ran broadly west to east. Although a continuous line from Oxford to Cambridge was proposed from time to time, it was actually built by local schemes.

From west to east, these were:

- the Buckinghamshire Railway, from Oxford to Bletchley;
- the Bedford Railway, from Bletchley to Bedford;
- the Bedford and Cambridge Railway, between those points, which adopted the alignment of an earlier private scheme, the Sandy and Potton Railway.

In time, these sections were all incorporated into the London and North Western Railway.

In the early days there were five intersecting trunk lines running south to north:

- The Great Western Railway at Oxford, with its northward allies;
- the London and Birmingham Railway, forming part of the later West Coast Main Line;
- the Midland Main Line, opened by the Midland Railway, crossing the route at Bedford;
- the East Coast Main Line, opened by the Great Northern Railway, forming a connection at Sandy; and
- the Eastern Counties Railway at Cambridge.

Two other trunk routes, the Great Western Railway's Bicester cut-off and the Great Central Railway main line, were built later.

=== Bedford Railway ===
The London and Birmingham Railway (L&BR) opened on 9 April 1838 as far north as Denbigh Hall, about a mile north of Bletchley (which was then a minor village). Initially, passengers alighted here to take a stagecoach on Watling Street to Rugby during construction work on the intervening section, which opened on 17 September 1838, and this temporary terminus was closed. Subsequently, and for a time, Wolverton (a few miles further north and on the main road between Oxford and Cambridge via Buckingham and Bedford) took over as an important stop on the line, as a point where engines were changed over and passengers rested.

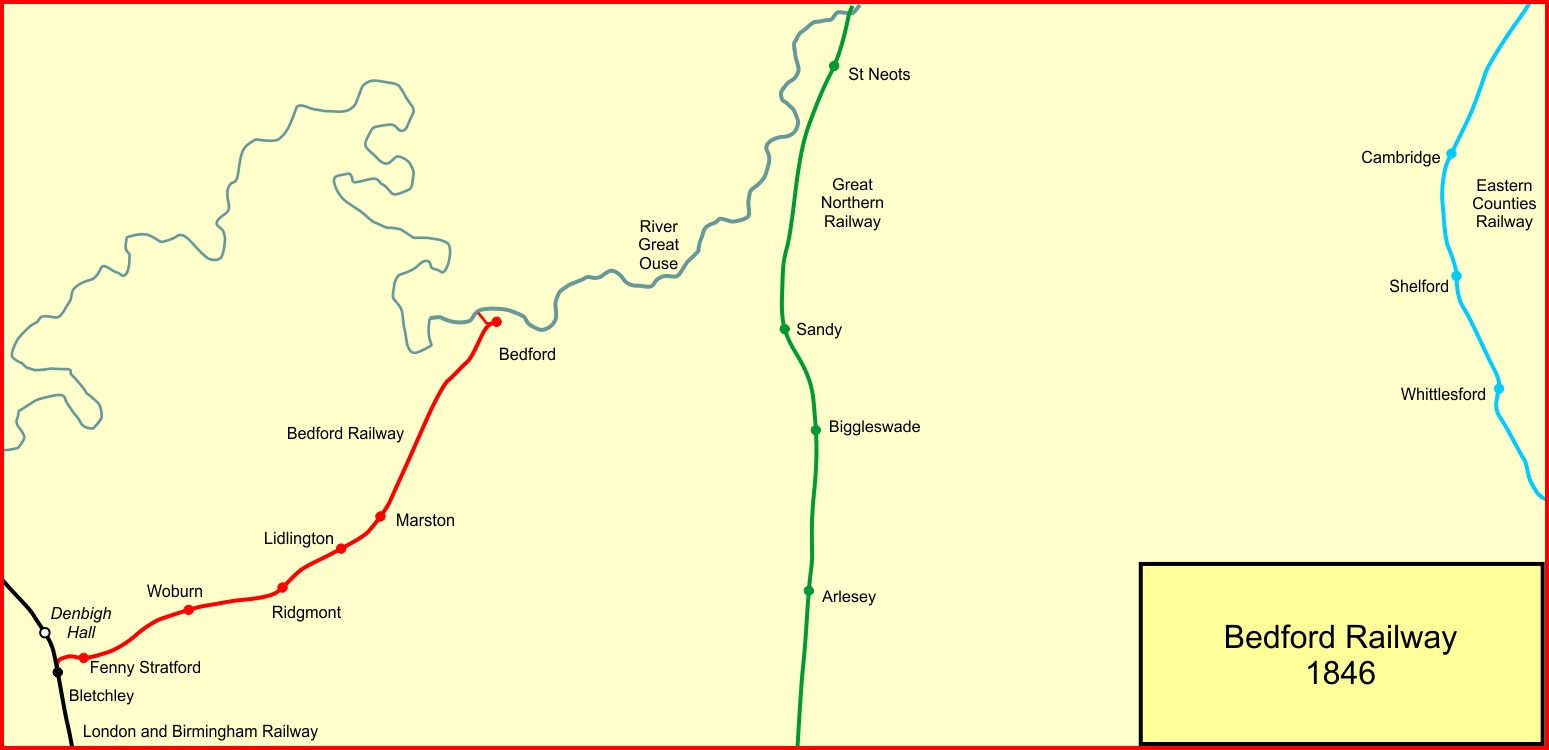
Bedford Railway in 1846

In 1836, proposals were put forward to build a line from Cambridge to join the L&BR (still under construction) at Bletchley; the line would have passed through Bedford, but the scheme was not taken forward. The obvious enhancement to the prosperity of Aylesbury following that town's connection to the L&BR changed attitudes, and as time passed, Bedford business interests sought a connection to the main line railway. In 1844 George Stephenson visited Bedford to discuss the matter. At a meeting on 23 April 1844 he set out his proposed scheme, for a line to Bedford joining the L&BR main line at Bletchley. Some opinions had preferred Wolverton as the junction, since Bletchley was not then a settlement of any significance.

A prospectus for the Bedford and London & Birmingham Railway was prepared; the capital was to be £125,000. (Note: About £13,000,000 today.) On 16 July 1846 the London and Birmingham Railway amalgamated with others, and formed the London and North Western Railway. A proposed extension of the Bedford line on to Cambridge through Hitchin was submitted to Parliament in the 1846 session but failed standing orders. The line to Bedford opened on 17 November 1846, when a ceremonial opening took 600 persons from Bedford to Bletchley in a special train. The new line had a connection to the River Great Ouse at Bedford, trailing from the Bletchley direction. (Note: It was soon made into a complete triangle, avoiding the necessity of providing a turntable for engine turning.) The Bedford station was not yet ready at the time of opening. The commercial benefit to Bedford, already well served by coastal water-borne commerce over the River Great Ouse, is indicated by the immediate fall of coal prices, from 1s 9d to 11d per cwt. There were four passenger trains each way, Sunday excepted, but this was soon enhanced to five each way, one of which was limited-stop, and two Sunday trains. Immediately on opening the Bedford Railway was absorbed into the London and North Western Railway. The terms were 4% per annum on the capital, plus half of any surplus. The LNWR had subscribed 1,522 of the 2,500 shares.

=== Buckinghamshire Railway ===
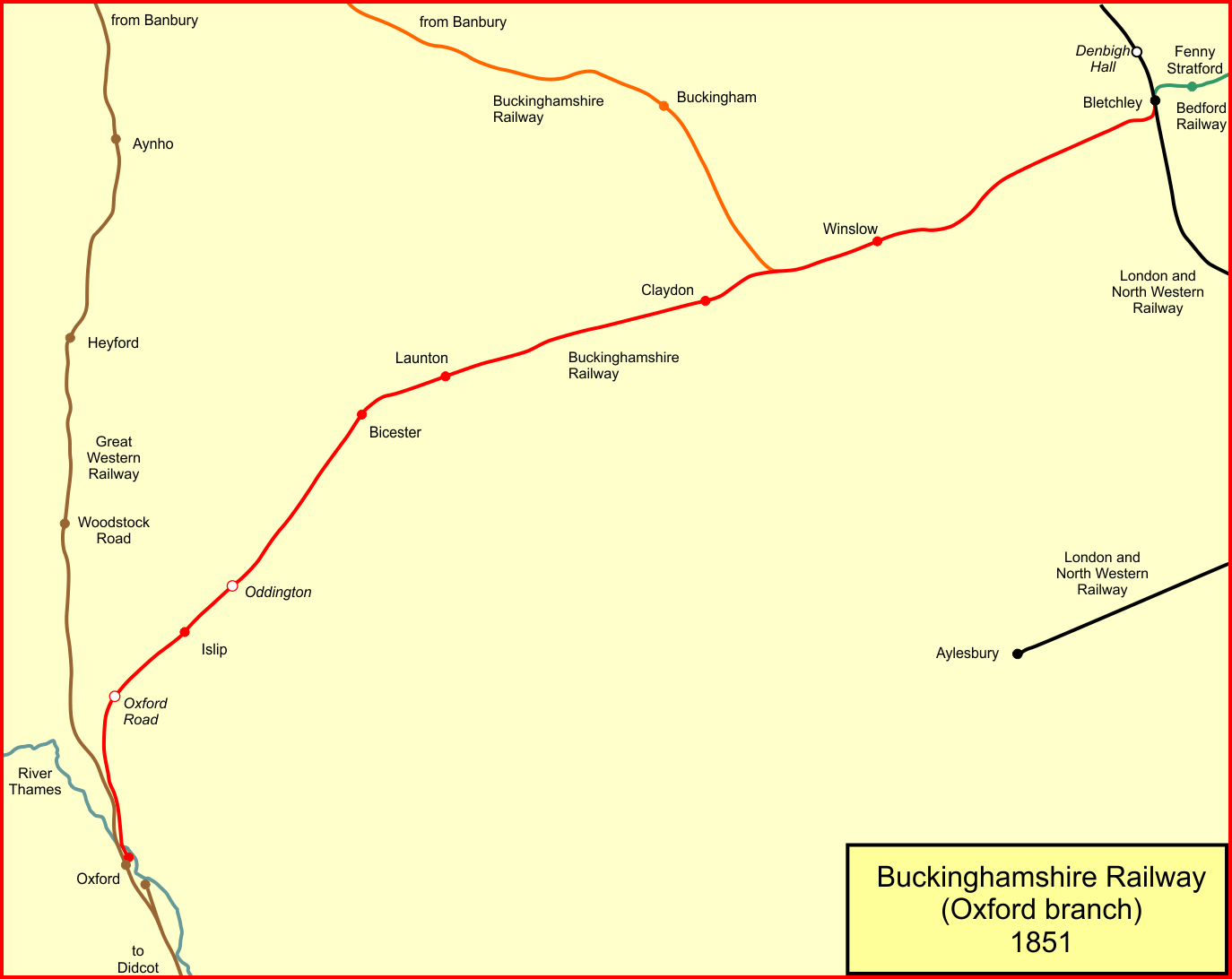
The Buckinghamshire Railway in 1851

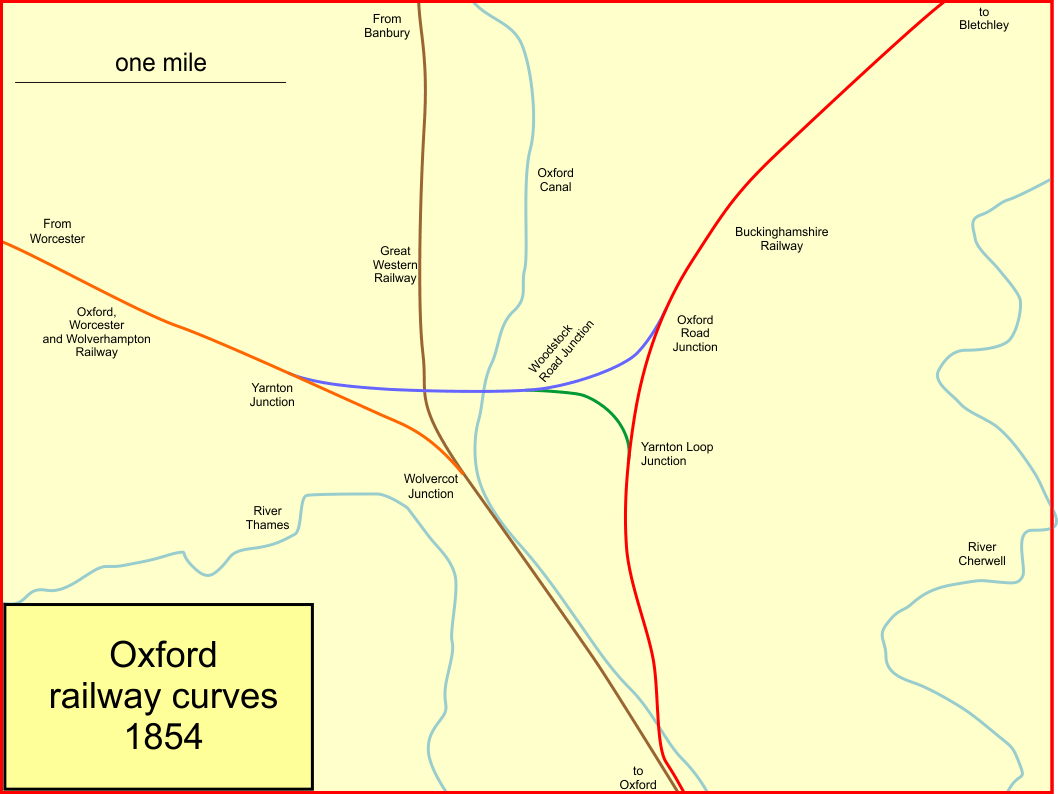
Railways at Oxford north in 1854

The Oxford and Bletchley Junction Railway and the Buckingham and Brackley Junction Railway had both been authorised in 1846, and before construction the two schemes were amalgamated to form the Buckinghamshire Railway, authorised by the Buckinghamshire Railway Act 1847 (10 & 11 Vict. c. ccxxxvi) on 22 July 1847. (Note: The first sod of the Buckingham and Brackley Junction Railway had been cut at Buckingham on 20 April 1847.) The new company would form a Y shape from Bletchley to both Oxford and Banbury. The 1847 powers also included an extension to Banbury, connecting to the Oxford and Rugby Railway there, and a southward extension from Verney Junction to join the Aylesbury branch. The scheme was encouraged by the London and North Western Railway, which wished to block northward encroachment from the Great Western Railway, whose area of influence at the time was further south.

The junction that became Verney Junction was known at first as Claydon Junction; the name Verney Junction was given to the station that was later established there. When the World War II link from the Great Central Railway main line was made, the junction there was called Claydon LNE Junction to emphasise the distinction.

Following authorisation of the Buckinghamshire Railway Company, the directors determined on 10 November 1847 to press ahead with the Banbury line in preference to the Oxford line. Work started on the last day of 1847. The line opened from Bletchley to Banbury on 1 May 1850 for passenger traffic, and goods trains started on 15 May 1850.

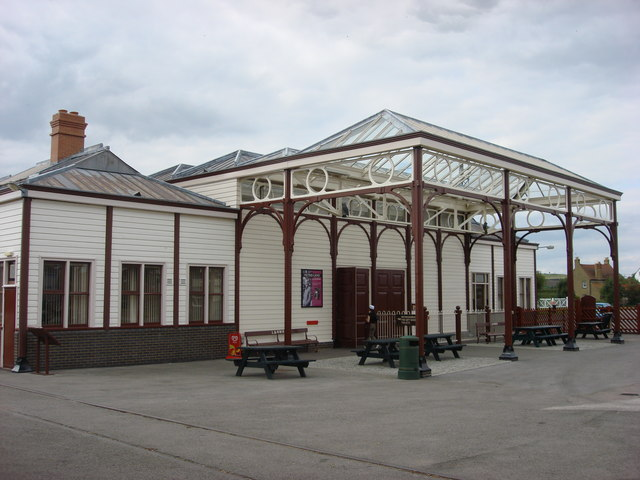
Rewley Road station building (preserved and relocated)

Opening of the Oxford line (from Claydon Junction, at first as a single track only) followed relatively swiftly: to Islip on 1 October 1850; on to Oxford Road on 2 December 1850. This station was at the crossing of the present-day A4165 road, and therefore near to the modern Oxford Parkway station. Horse omnibuses and carts connected the station with Oxford itself. The line was extended to the company's own station at Oxford on 20 May 1851. It was a single track west of Claydon Junction.

The 1853 passenger timetable shows 4 trains each way daily except Sundays, the first trains each way divided and joined Buckingham portions at Winslow. The journey time Oxford to Bletchley was 75 minutes and a typical journey Oxford to London took about 2 hours 45 minutes.

The company had its own station at Oxford. It was fortunate in finding a site: Rewley Abbey had long since fallen into ruins, and the site was made available. Approaching trains crossed a swing bridge over the Sheepwash Channel to reach it. The junction with Oxford and Rugby Railway at Banbury was not made by the company, and the southwards extension from Verney was abandoned for the time being.

The LNWR provided more than half the capital and worked the line from the beginning, and leased it for 999 years from 1 July 1851 guaranteeing a 4% dividend to the other shareholders. The LNWR absorbed the Buckinghamshire Railway Company on 21 July 1879. Early in 1854 the line from Verney Junction to Oxford was doubled, completing double track along the full length of the line. Verney was a junction, but no station was built until 1868, prompted by the construction of the Aylesbury and Buckingham Railway.

=== Wolverhampton to London via Bletchley ===
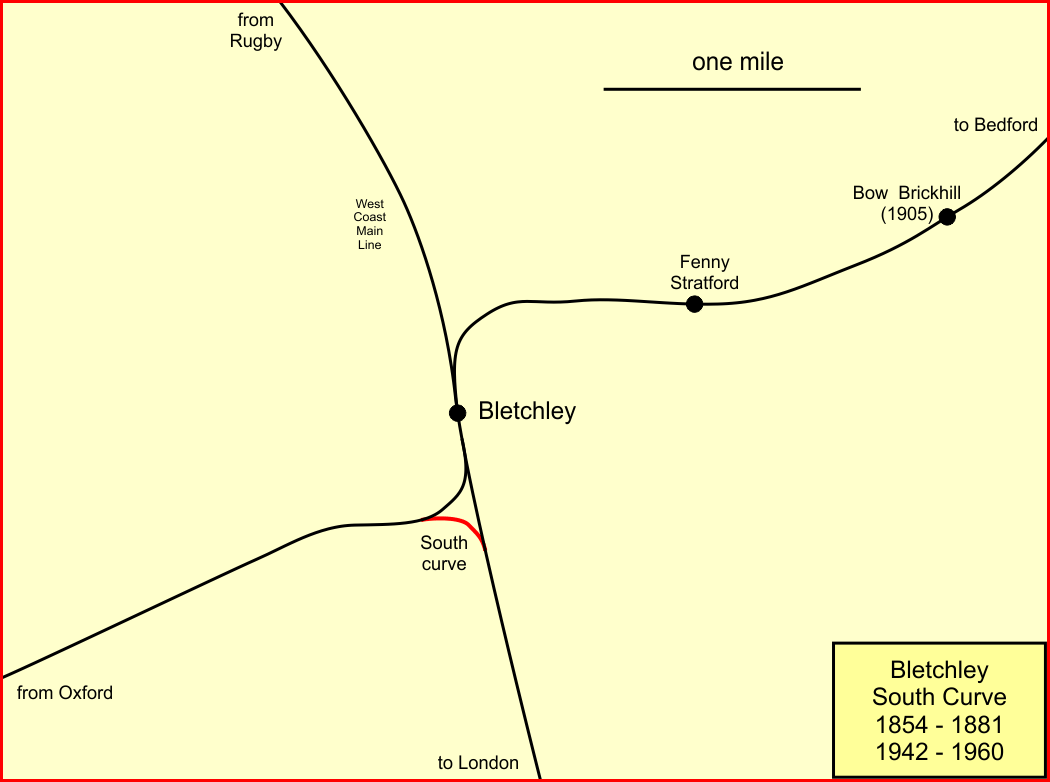
Railway lines at Bletchley in 1854

The Oxford, Worcester and Wolverhampton Railway was authorised by the Oxford, Worcester and Wolverhampton Railway Act 1845 (8 & 9 Vict. c. clxxxiv) as a broad gauge line on 4 August 1845. Its line was to be 89 miles in length, connecting to the Great Western Railway at Wolvercot Junction, just north of Oxford. The cost of the line was heavy, and the estimates fell considerably short, so that the company was constantly short of funds during the construction period. For some time it concentrated its resources on the northern part of the authorised line.

Although the OW&WR had originally been expected to be an ally of the GWR, the friendly relations cooled, and the London and North Western Railway (as owner of the Oxford to Bletchley line) developed good relations with the OW&WR. The LNWR tried to negotiate a takeover of the OW&WR, but this was rejected in Parliament; and in 1852 a direct connection between the LNWR Bletchley line and the OW&WR was also thrown out. In 1853 however the proposed connection (later known as the Yarnton Spur) was approved, and on 4 June 1853 the OW&WR had opened its line as far as Wolvercot Junction, its southern extremity.

The Yarnton Spur was a short double-track line, 1 mile 49 chains (1.61 mi; 2.6 km) in length, from Oxford Road Junction to Yarnton, and it was opened on 1 April 1854. The LNWR at once started operating through passenger services between Euston and Wolverhampton, via Bletchley, Yarnton Spur and the OW&WR. The trains were worked by the LNWR as far as Hanborough, and also from Dudley to Wolverhampton LNWR station via the South Staffordshire curve at Tipton.

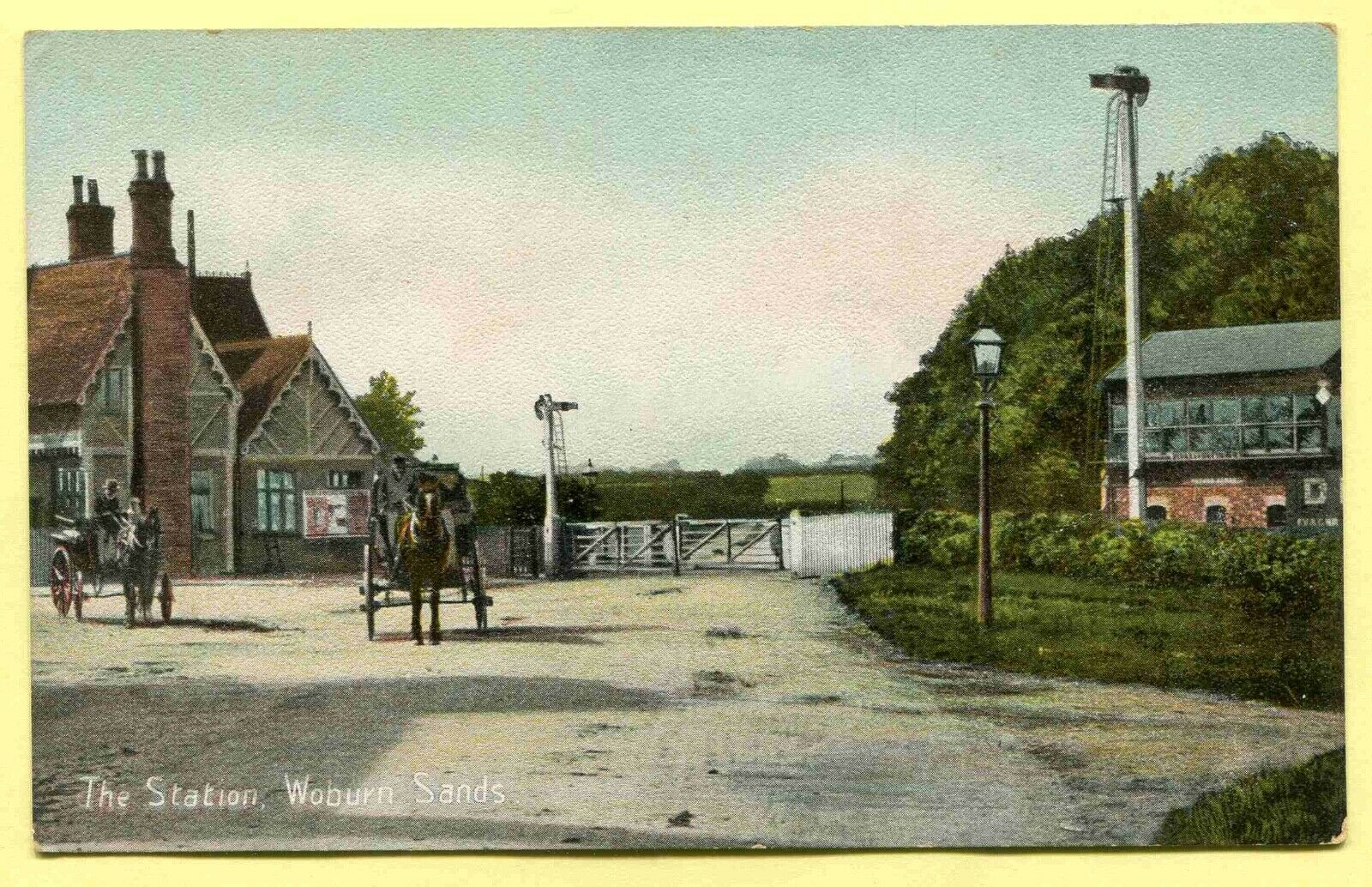
Woburn Sands railway station, about 1895

The Buckinghamshire Railway connection at Bletchley left in a southward direction, and a west to south chord was brought into use there in October 1854 to permit direct running between Euston and the Buckinghamshire line.

A west to south curve to the Yarnton Spur was opened, allowing direct access from the OW&WR line to the LNWR Oxford station; this was used chiefly for goods traffic, but in the autumn of 1857 local passenger trains used it during a period of exceptionally strained relations between the OW&WR and the GWR.

The service to London over the LNWR ceased by 1 September 1861; the west to south curve at Yarnton was reduced to a through siding only shortly afterwards, and the west to south curve at Bletchley was closed and lifted in 1864. Nevertheless, the goods and mineral traffic from the OW&WR line remained considerable; Lawrence, writing in 1910, said that, "In March last, no fewer than 7,500 coal trucks made use of the loop."

=== Verney Junction ===
There was a junction but no station at Verney Junction until 1868, when the Aylesbury and Buckingham Railway completed their line from Aylesbury to Verney. The Great Western Railway worked the A&BR trains until the company was absorbed by the Metropolitan Railway in 1891, becoming the northern terminus of the Metropolitan Railway. Two Pullman cars worked to Baker Street daily.

=== Joint station proposed for Bedford ===
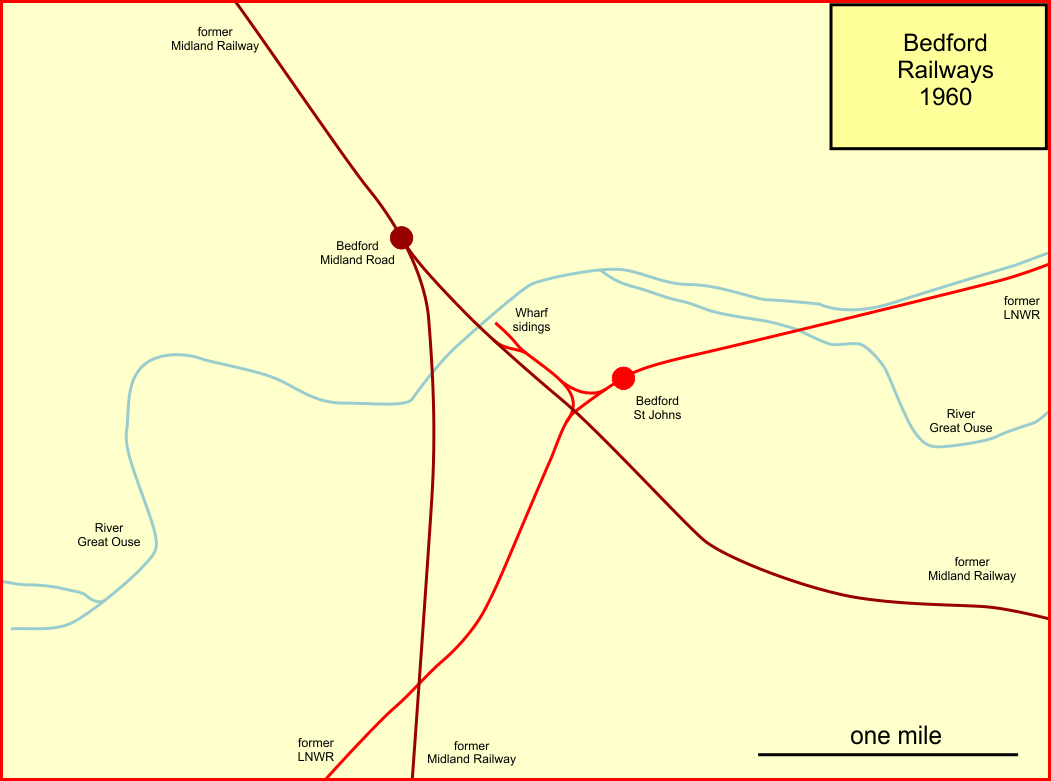
The railways of Bedford in 1860

The Oxford to Cambridge line crossed under the Midland main line, and there were two separate passenger stations. In November 1855 officers of the Midland Railway and the LNWR met to consider the construction of a joint station at Bedford. It would have been a little to the west of the contemporary LNWR station. The scheme was agreed to be desirable and feasible, but the Midland Railway board declined to approve it, and it foundered.

=== Sandy and Potton Railway ===
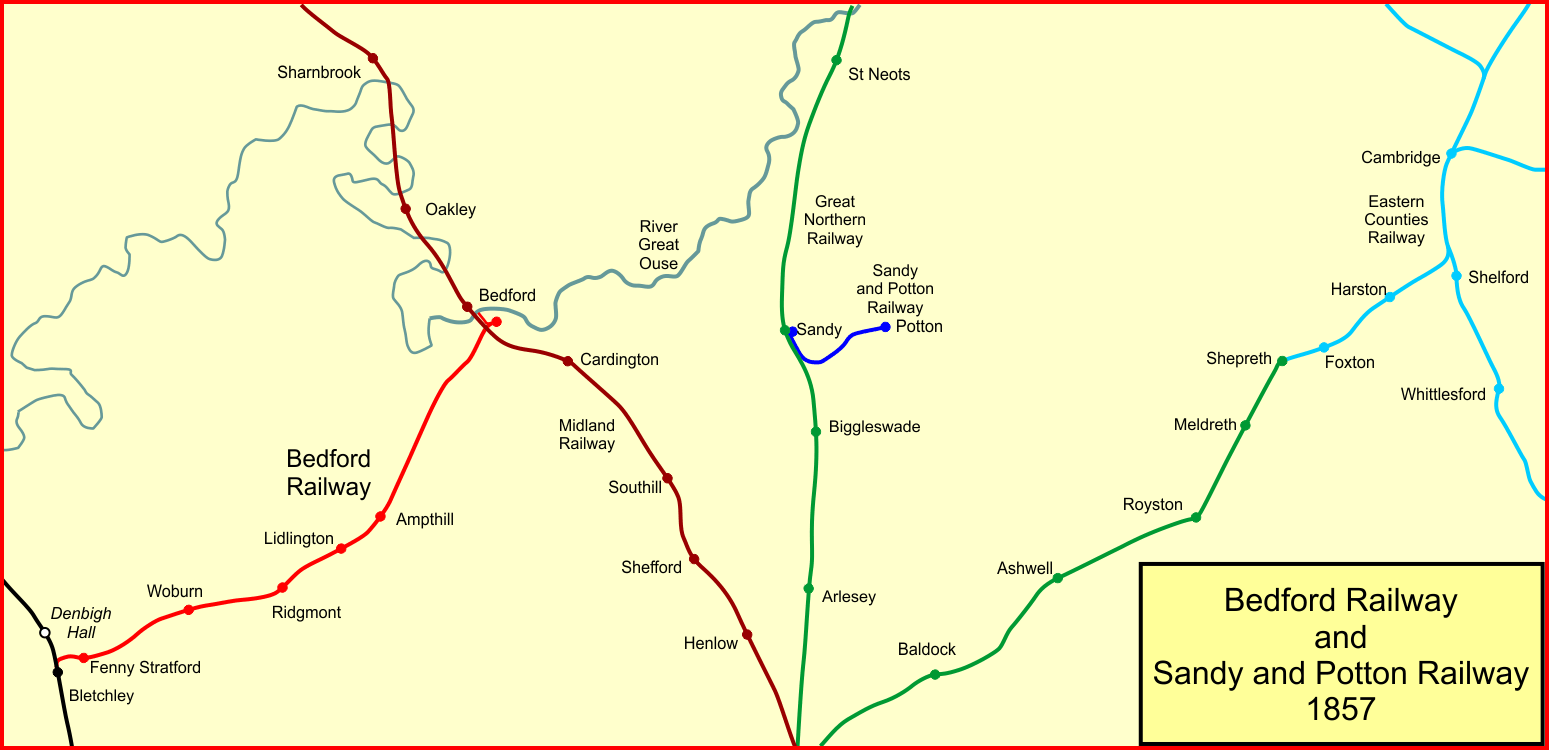
The Sandy and Potton Railway in context

The Great Northern Railway had opened its line from London to Peterborough on 7 June 1850, ultimately giving access to York, and running through Sandy.

The Sandy and Potton Railway was planned by Captain Sir William Peel. He had settled in Potton, and conceived a railway running almost entirely over his own lands, connecting with the Great Northern Railway at Sandy. The length of the line was 3 1/2 miles, and an opening ceremony was held in June 1857. The line opened to public goods traffic on 23 June 1857. A Board of Trade inspection took place on 5 November 1857, and this was successful, enabling opening of the line to passengers on 9 November 1857. Peel acquired a locomotive for the line from George England and Co. of Hatcham; it was named Shannon, after the frigate commanded by Peel. (Note: There may have been a second engine: Simpson says (volume 2 page 15): Another engine, no 2, Little England, was bought by the LNWR for £350.) A locomotive was hired from the GNR on one or two occasions, and passenger rolling stock was supplied by the GNR. The line had cost £15,000 to build. (Note: about £1,500,000 today.)

The GNR had allowed Captain Peel to terminate his line in their Sandy goods yard, on condition that he would remove his works if the GNR required the site.

=== Bedford and Cambridge Railway ===
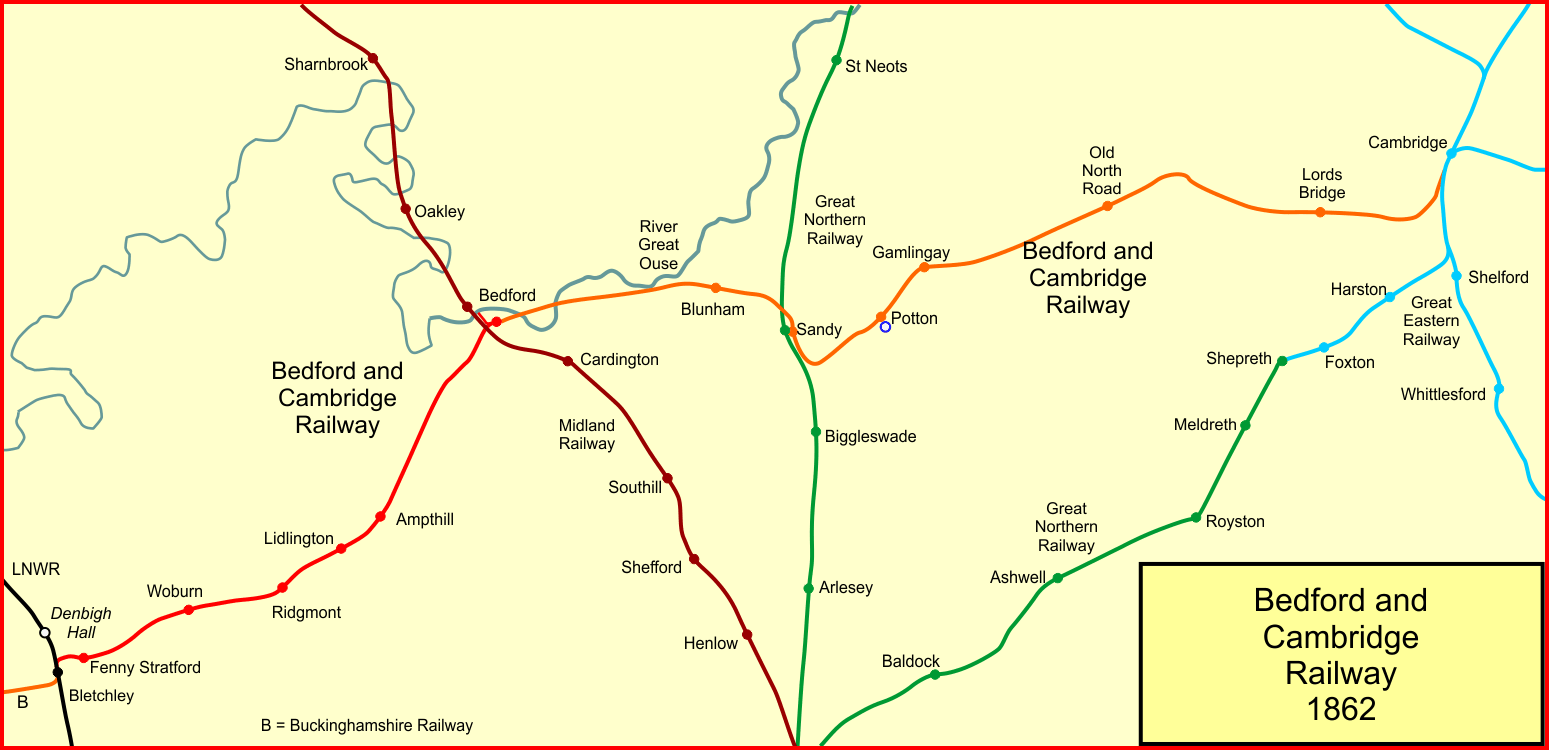
The Bedford and Cambridge Railway, 1862

In 1859 the Cambridge aspirations of several railway companies were competing for parliamentary approval. A proposed Bedford, Potton and Cambridge Railway was thrown out, but the reverse showed that an alliance with the Great Northern Railway might prove fruitful.

Bedford and Cambridge Railway Act 1860
- Act of Parliament
- Parliament of the United Kingdom
- Long title: An Act for establishing Railway Communication between Bedford and Cambridge, and for other Purposes.
- Citation: 23 & 24 Vict. c. clxxxiii

Dates
- Royal assent: 6 August 1860

Text of statute as originally enacted

In the 1860 session of Parliament, the Bedford and Cambridge Railway (as it now styled itself) got royal assent for the Bedford and Cambridge Railway Act 1860 (23 & 24 Vict. c. clxxxiii) on 6 August 1860. The Great Northern Railway planned to build from Shepreth to this new line near Lords Bridge and thus gain access to Cambridge.

The Bedford and Cambridge Railway was to take over the Sandy and Potton Railway and use its alignment. The route chosen entered the southern extremity of Cambridge alongside the Eastern Counties route from London, at Cambridge being permitted to use a platform at the ECR station. There was to be a separate LNWR goods station west of Hills Road.

In fact the construction significantly overran cost estimates, and the company had to confer with the LNWR (as prospective lessee) about how to raise the extra cash. The authorised capital had been £240,000, and this had never fully been subscribed, and after opening the estimated cost to complete had risen to £370,175. This at last proved to be accurate. There was acrimony between the companies, but the LNWR underwrote the extra capital, and after considerable further negotiation, the LNWR absorbed the Bedford and Cambridge Railway Company by a share conversion, equating to 4% on the £240,000 original capital.

It opened on 7 July 1862 for passengers, and for goods in October 1862. The Sandy and Potton Railway had been purchased for £20,000. On 1 July 1862 the Eastern Counties Railway was restructured into the Great Eastern Railway.

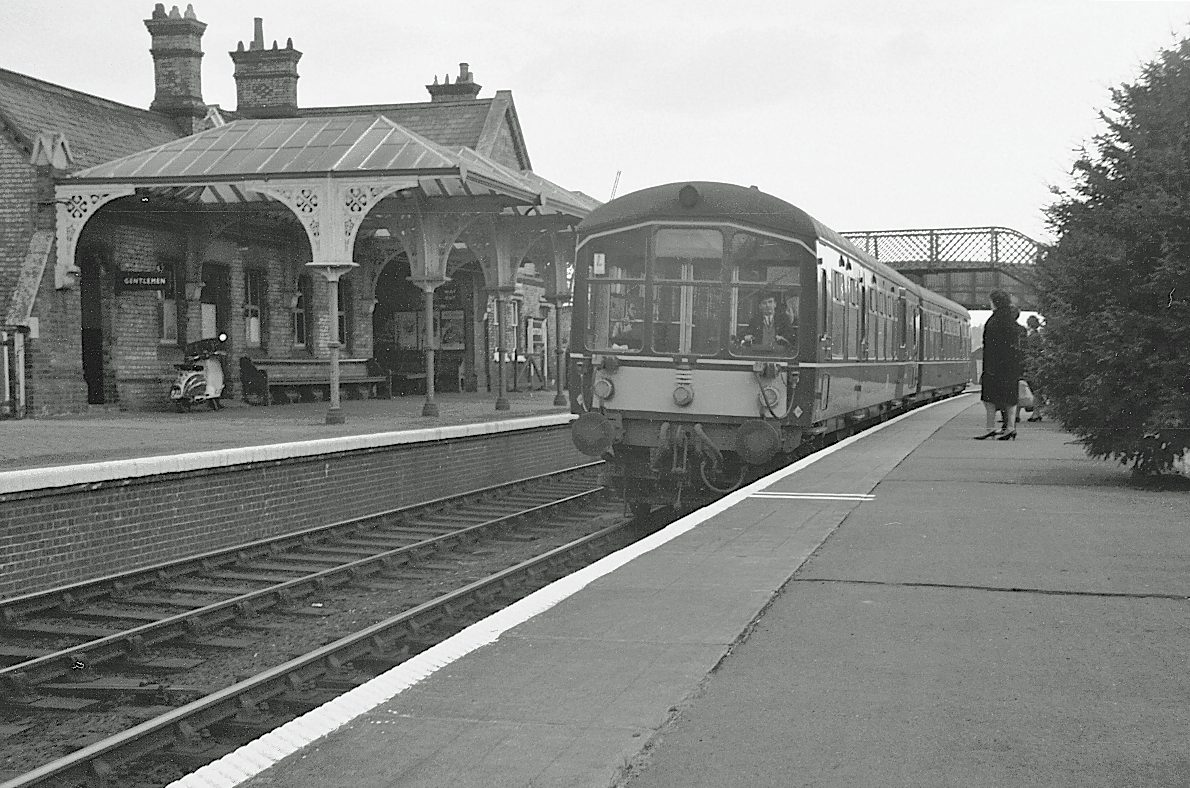
Potton Station in 1967

The May 1864 working timetable shows four passenger trains running throughout from Cambridge to Bletchley, and one early train from Bedford to Bletchley, and three goods trains. One Sunday passenger train is shown. Most of the passenger trains appear to continue to Oxford and London, probably by through coach attached to other trains.

Bedford and Cambridge Railway Act 1864
- Act of Parliament
- Parliament of the United Kingdom
- Long title: An Act to authorize Arrangements between the Bedford and Cambridge and London and North-western Railway Companies; and for other Purposes.
- Citation: 27 & 28 Vict. c. lxii

Dates
- Royal assent: 23 June 1864

Working arrangements were made with the LNWR, authorised by the Bedford and Cambridge Railway Act 1864 (27 & 28 Vict. c. lxii) of 23 June 1864. The company was absorbed by the LNWR on 5 July 1865.

The line as constructed was single; double track was later constructed between Sandy and Gamlingay on 20 October 1870, and on to Cambridge on 10 July 1871.

The Midland Railway's London extension opened in 1857, at this stage to Hitchin. It crossed the LNWR line at Bedford by a (nearly) 90-degree flat crossing; although it was undesirable, it was considered an appropriate economy measure as compared with a bridge crossing. (Note: In fact the western apex of the engine turning triangle was crossed by the Midland line, forming a complex permanent way construction.)

=== Railmotors ===
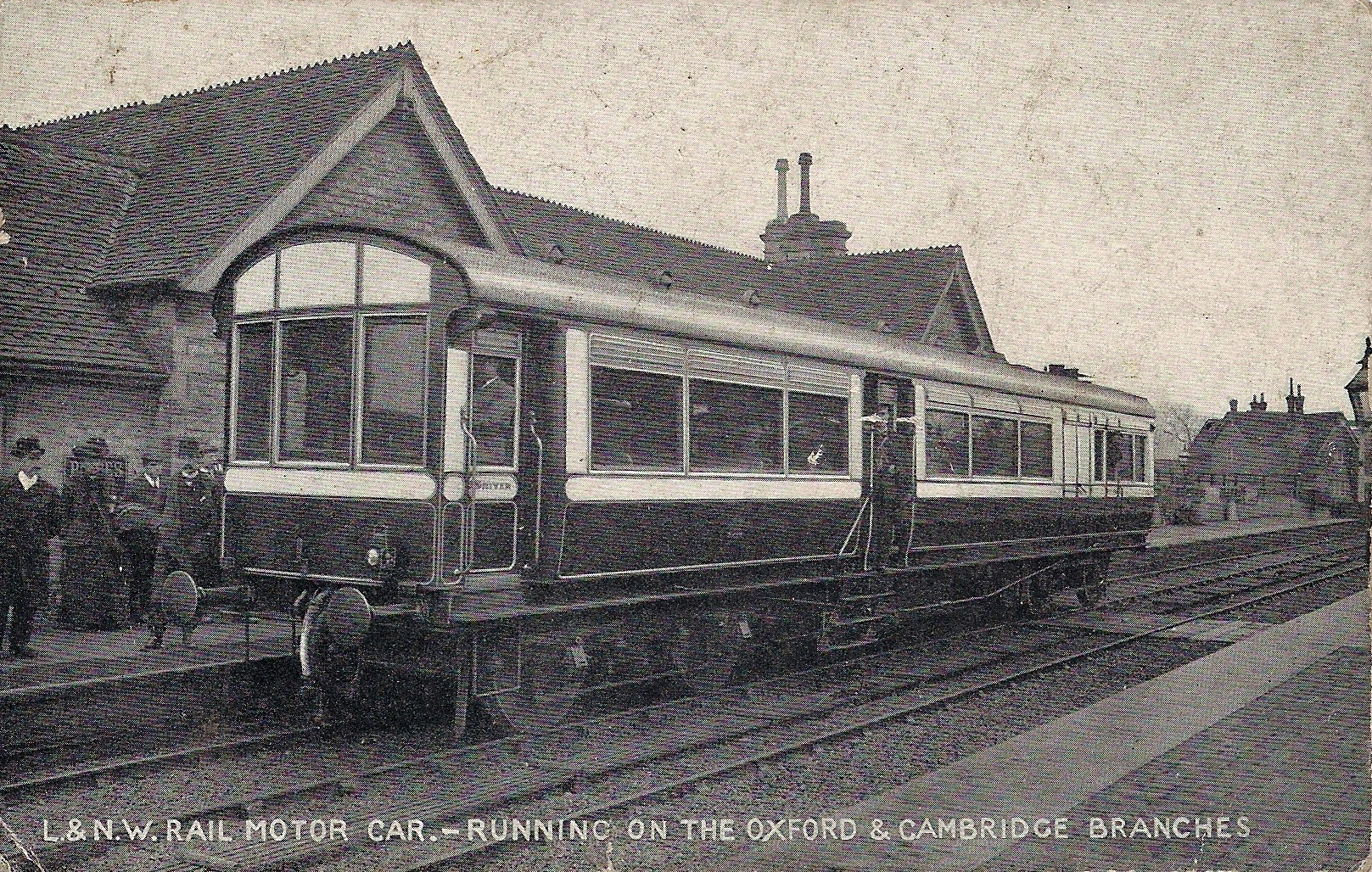
Railmotor at Bicester Town railway station

In the early twentieth century, railways sought lower-cost methods of operating passenger trains. The LNWR experimented with a steam railmotor. This was a single passenger coach, designed at Wolverton, with a small integrated steam locomotive. A railmotor was brought to Oxford for trials with a service to Bicester. However, during a trial run on 5 October 1905 the vehicle developed a hot axlebox, and the opening was deferred to the 9th. The railmotor was found to be capable of a top speed of 45 miles per hour (72 km/h), and was timed for 30 minutes for the 12 miles (19 km) to Bicester.

The vehicle had seats for 48 passengers in two saloons, smoking and non-smoking. The transverse seating had reversible backs, to allow passengers to face the direction in which they were going. They were considered by users to be very comfortable. Woodwork was framed teak and the coach was lit electrically. Alighting and departing the vehicle at the ground level platforms of the halts was effected by a set of steps that swung out from the body of the vehicle. The steps were interlocked with the brakes. In 1905, there were six workings between Oxford and Bicester, with one additional on Thursday and Saturday, in each direction.

A number of small timber platform halts were built to facilitate the new service. The halts were unstaffed, and tickets were issued by a conductor on the train. The first was Summertown Halt, opened on 20 August 1906. By the following January the name had been changed to Port Meadow. The remainder of the halts were opened on 9 October 1905.

From 1 December 1905, a steam railmotor was operated between Bedford and Bletchley also, and several new halts were opened. Three vehicles were used, one being kept as a maintenance spare.

Due to World War I, the six halts were closed from 1 January 1917, and were reopened on 5 May 1919. The railmotors had limitations: they were underpowered, had insufficient accommodation, and suffered from reliability problems. In about 1921, they were replaced by autotrains, which used a conventional locomotive operating in combination with a coach that was adapted to allow the driver to control the train from the coach when it was being propelled. The autotrains, and the halts west of Bicester, were finally withdrawn on 25 October 1926, during the General Strike, but competition from road omnibuses had led to a significant decline in rail patronage.

The system continued further east but, in 1959, the autotrains were replaced by diesel multiple units, and the remaining stopping places were given raised platforms.

From Oxford to Islip, the railmotor halts were: Summertown Halt, soon renamed Port Meadow, Wolvercote, and Oxford Road, and between Islip and Bicester: Oddington, Charlton, and Wendlebury Halt, near Bicester. The eastern section halts were Bow Brickhill, Aspley Guise, Husborne Crawley, Wootton Pillinge, Wootton Broadmead, Kempston Hardwick, and Kempston & Elstow.

== Grouping of the railways ==
At the beginning of 1923, the main line railways of Great Britain were "grouped" into one or other of four new, large companies, in compliance with the Railways Act 1921. The LNWR and the Midland Railway were constituents of the new London Midland and Scottish Railway. The Great Western Railway absorbed a number of other concerns and continued under the same name. The Great Northern Railway and the Great Eastern Railway were constituents of the new London and North Eastern Railway.

The whole of the Oxford to Cambridge line was thus part of the new LMS. In the 1930s, the major railways adopted a novel form of collaboration in the interest of reducing operating expenses. In 1934 the Stationmaster of the GWR's Oxford General station took over the management of the LMS's Rewley Road station. Cartage lorries in Oxford carried the initials of both companies.

=== The Micheline railcar ===
In 1931, the Michelin Tyre Company was trying to market an internal combustion (petrol) railcar, which it named the Micheline. It was a ten-wheel articulated vehicle, with pneumatic rubber tyres. It was tried on the line in 1932. Carrying only 24 passengers and with uncertain reliability, it had many of the disadvantages of the steam railmotors, and the trial did not lead to adoption of the system. (Note: Simpson includes a note implying earlier trials of petrol railcars on the line, but does not elaborate: "The text on page 38 is taken from a Micheline Tyre Company booklet selling the idea of the new type of internal combustion railcar. An idea not new to the Oxford line since the LNWR experiment early in the century.")

=== Diesel railcar ===
On 12 September 1938, a new diesel railcar design started work on the line. It was a three-car articulated unit, powered by six 125 hp diesel engines; the design was stylish and futuristic, and included central control of sliding passenger doors by the guard. The train was designed at Derby LMS.

Three journeys throughout the Oxford to Cambridge line were undertaken daily, with some short fill-in trips. The journey time Oxford to Cambridge, with three stops, (Bletchley, Bedford and Sandy) was 1 hour 45 minutes, comparing favourably with the 3 hour steam train journey. The runs were not advertised in the ordinary timetables, but only by handbills locally.

The outbreak of World War II prevented further development of this experimental system.

=== World War II ===
In September 1939, the United Kingdom declared war on Germany. Aerial bombardment of UK cities and industrial sites was expected, and it was considered essential to create a trunk route for goods traffic avoiding London, which was expected to be the principal target of bombing. The Cambridge to Oxford route was selected to be the core of this route, because of its intersections with several trunk routes. Where existing connections between railways on the route were inadequate, relatively simple enhancements would resolve the difficulty.

Wragg describes the situation:

The solution was to build what amounted to a railway by-pass of London. Of necessity this was some distance from the capital, both to avoid disruption from heavy air raids, and also to utilise existing lines as far as possible. The start of this massive loop was the old London and North Western line from Cambridge to Oxford…

There were good existing connections in and out of this line at Bedford and Bletchley, but at Sandy and at Oxford time-consuming shunting movements would be necessary, so here again new connections were hastily installed and opened during 1940. There was no link at all at Calvert so a completely new link was created.

In November 1940 Oxford North Junction was created, enabling through running from the Bletchley line towards Oxford GWR station. A south-to-east chord line was constructed at Claydon across an area called Shepherd's Furze, connecting the former Great Central Main Line with the line from Bletchley. This link proved a useful connection in addition to its emergency value, and it saw much traffic during the war.

At Bletchley, the old west-to-south curve, removed in 1864, was reinstated, opening on 31 August 1942. The Bicester Military Railway was built; it served a very large depot for ordnance and equipment. The civilian railway authorities protested at the adverse impact the railway movements to and from the depot would have on the ordinary war effort of the LNWR line, and the Ministry of War Transport agreed to the building of a new 660 wagon capacity yard at Swanbourne, about 3 1/2 miles west of Bletchley.

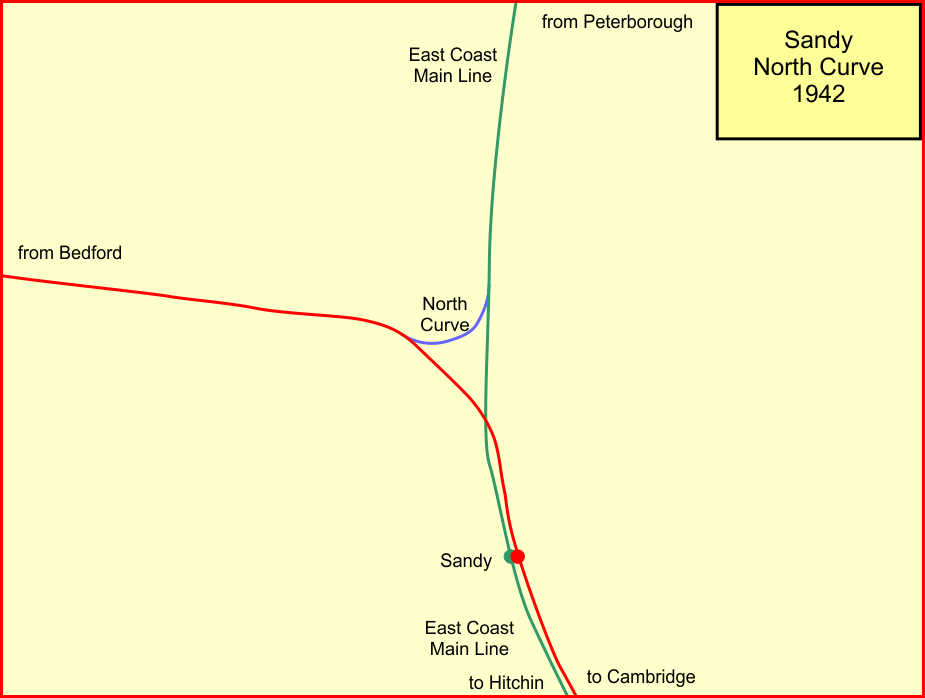
Sandy North Curve

The Railway Executive also constructed a west-to-north connection at Sandy; it opened in 1942. However it did not prove to have a strategic value in peacetime and was removed after the war.

Crump explains the strategic significance:

The combined length of [the Sandy and Claydon curves] cannot have been much more than a mile, but in conjunction with a link joining the Great Western and Southern lines at Staines they provided a route for trains from the Great Northern to run via Sandy, Bletchley, Calvert, High Wycombe, Greenford and Staines on to the Southern. This route would have been of the utmost use if the London junctions had been destroyed. Actually it was only used on a few occasions, and the operating difficulties were considerable.

=== Bicester Military Railway ===
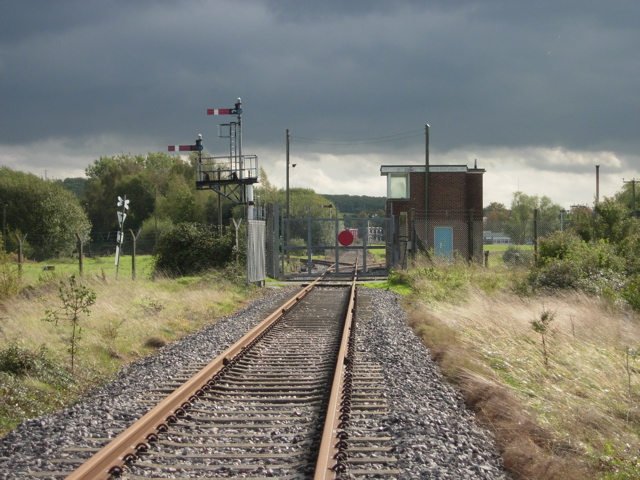
Arncott Supply Depot

In the late 1930s, a site at Bicester was selected for a large Ordnance Depot to be road and rail served. Construction of the Depot began in July 1940. The railway part of the site would start from a junction with the Oxford to Bletchley line and encircle the two hills of Graven Hill and Arncott. By the end of 1941 the exchange sidings had been laid, and in 1942 the first troop train entered the depot from Bicester station. The site was heavily used during the war, particularly in the preparations for D-Day.

Since the war, the site has been retained as a base for the Royal Logistic Corps. At its peak there were about 40 single-track miles of layout within the depot.

The Oxford connection was useful in peacetime and was retained. The same is true of the Claydon curve, which provided a useful route for certain freight flows, and for empty passenger stock moves. The Bicester and Sandy connections proved less useful, and were removed.

== Nationalisation ==
The main line railways of Great Britain were taken into state ownership at the beginning of 1948, pursuant to the Transport Act 1948. The entire line was in the London Midland Region of British Railways at first, but in 1951 the section from just east of Bicester to Oxford was transferred to the Western Region.

=== Transfer to the GWR station at Oxford ===
The operation of two passenger stations at Oxford was obviously wasteful and the wartime connection allowed trains from the Bletchley direction to run directly into the GWR's Oxford General station.

In October 1951, a complete transfer of passenger operation at Oxford into this (former GWR) station, now named simply Oxford railway station, took place. Most goods workings were transferred to the former GWR Hinksey yard, and Rewley Road station handled only coal and some general goods traffic.

=== 1955 development plan: goods ===
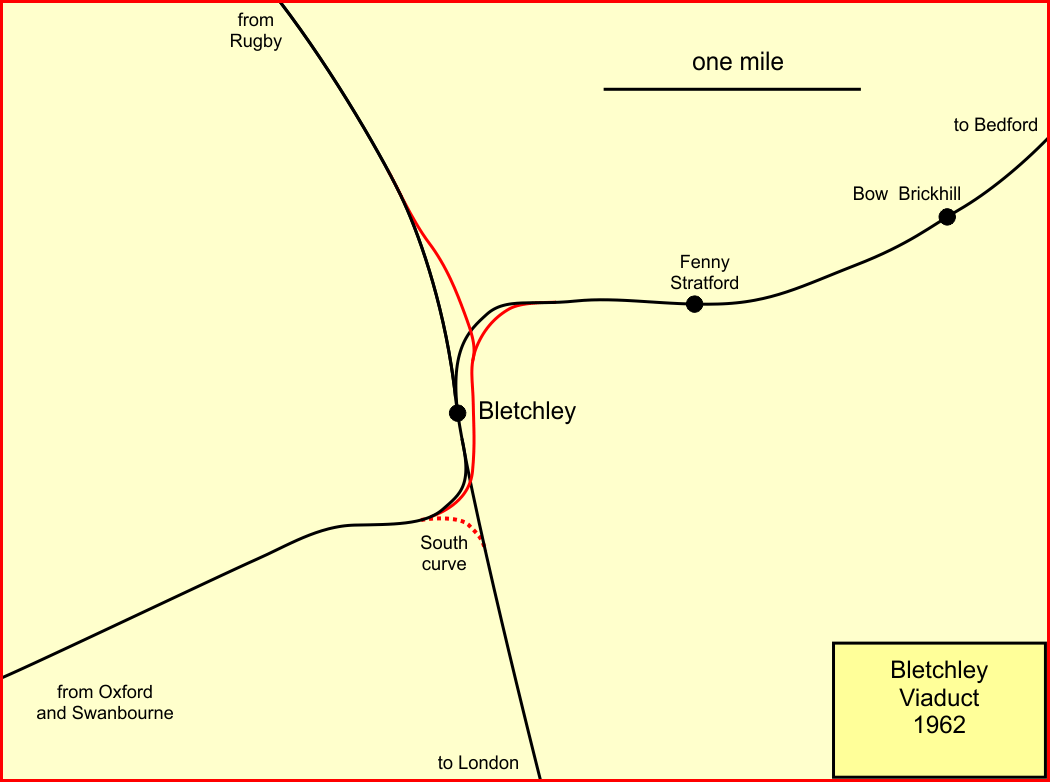
Railway lines at Bletchley after construction of the Bletchley Flyover

In the first years of British Railways, the organisation was beset with falling demand as costs increased. In 1955 a report, The Modernisation and Re-equipment of British Railways, was published. £1.2 billion would be spent on the project. Subsidiary reports recommended the development of the Oxford to Cambridge line as part of an outer freight ring route from Cambridge to Ashford (Kent) via Oxford, Reading and Tonbridge, keeping freight flows away from London. The cost was to be £15 million. A large marshalling yard was to be built at Swanbourne, and the Bletchley Flyover (a viaduct over the West Coast Main Line beside Bletchley station).

Work on the Swanbourne yard and the Bletchley viaduct started in September 1958. The viaduct was ready in 1962 (it had cost £1.5 million) but work was halted on the marshalling yard.

Gerry Fiennes was Chief Operating Officer, British Railways, at the time and wrote that he was convinced marshalling yards should be built in the areas of production and consumption, and not, like Swanbourne, in greenfield sites:

I did stop Swanbourne, Brookthorpe and Walcot [two other green field proposals]. The Bletchley flyover remains as a memorial to those who failed to see that railways must live by concentration and not dispersal. We had … driven … a pretty big nail into Swanbourne's coffin by refusing to put into it any East Coast traffic. From that moment the writing was on the wall. Swanbourne should have been stopped then.

— Gerry Fiennes

== Rationalisation and extensive section closures ==
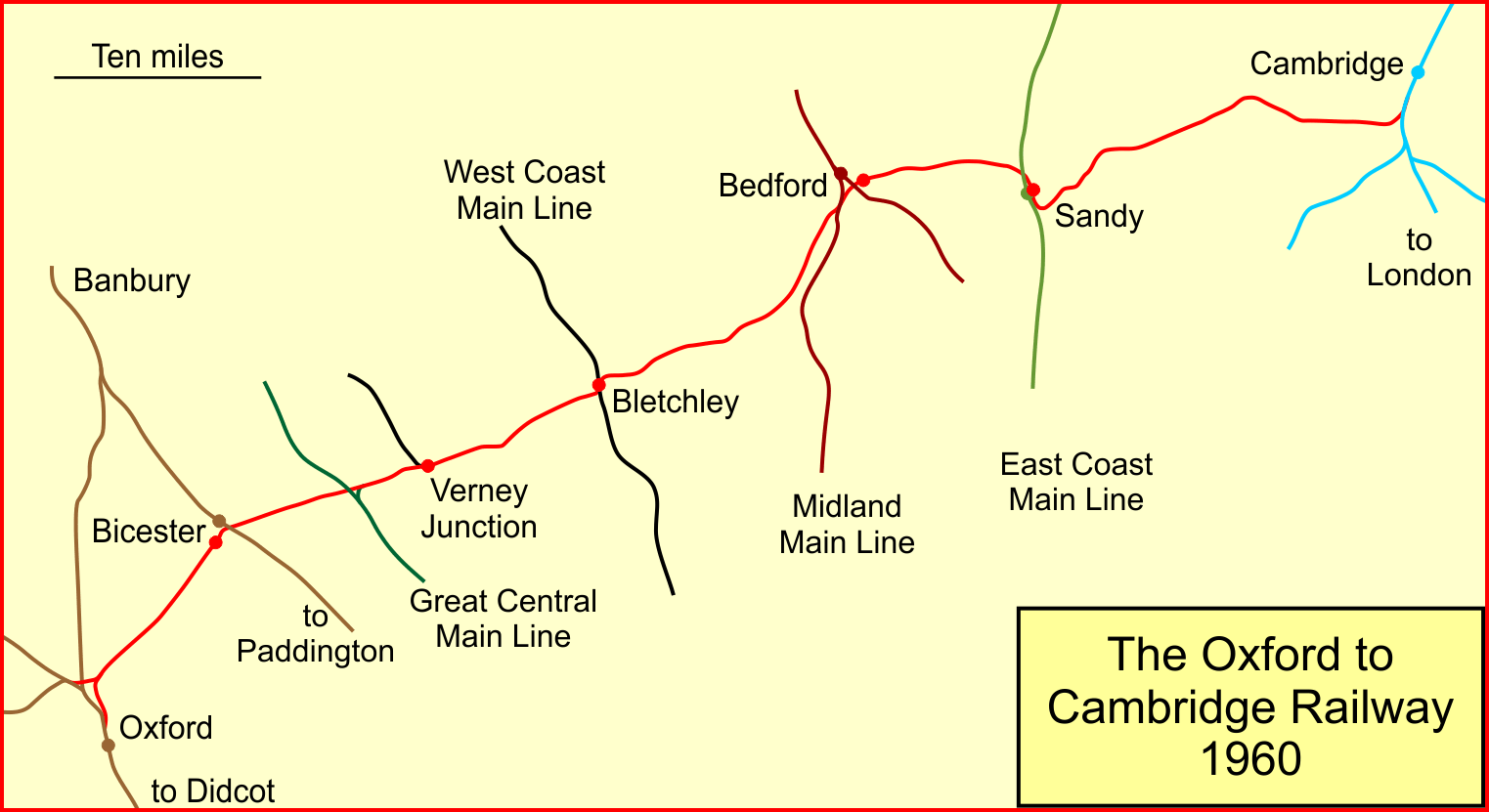
The Oxford to Cambridge railway line in 1960

If development of passenger business on the line had been envisaged in 1955, that too was suddenly reversed, and in 1959 closure of the entire route was considered. However the introduction of diesel multiple unit passenger trains in that year substantially reduced operating costs, and the closure idea was rescinded. In the Beeching Report of 1963, retention of the line was recommended, with only minor curtailment, but in December 1963 closure was once again put forward, as income was only a little over half of operating expenses. Closure was approved, and most local freight facilities were withdrawn on 18 April 1966.

Following public protest, passenger operation on the central section between Bedford and Bletchley was retained (and continues in use as the Marston Vale Line). Delay in arranging substitute bus services resulted in the passenger closure of the remainder being deferred to 1 January 1968. The line from Bedford (Goldington Power Station) to the junction at Cambridge was closed completely; the wartime marshalling yard at Swanbourne was closed in March 1967.

The Buckingham branch closed to passengers on 7 September 1964 and to goods on 5 December 1966.

In 1967, the line between Bicester and Oxford was closed to passengers and, in October 1973, reduced to single track. Following that time, for some years the chief use of the line was as a connection from Aylesbury via Claydon LNE Junction to Bletchley for stone trains, refuse trains from the Bristol area, and empty passenger stock movements. The freight-only section between Bicester and Bletchley was mothballed by Trainload Freight in 1993 following the closure of the ARC roadstone terminal at Wolverton. Until earlier that year, there had been up to three limestone workings from Whatley to Wolverton, plus the daily Avon-Calvert binliner but this had been re-routed via London and Aylesbury. The fertiliser flow from Ince and Elton to Akeman Street had ended due to changing modal distribution. The Oxford-Bicester section remained open for freight traffic to Bicester Central Ordnance Depot and the reinitated passenger service.

=== East West Rail ===
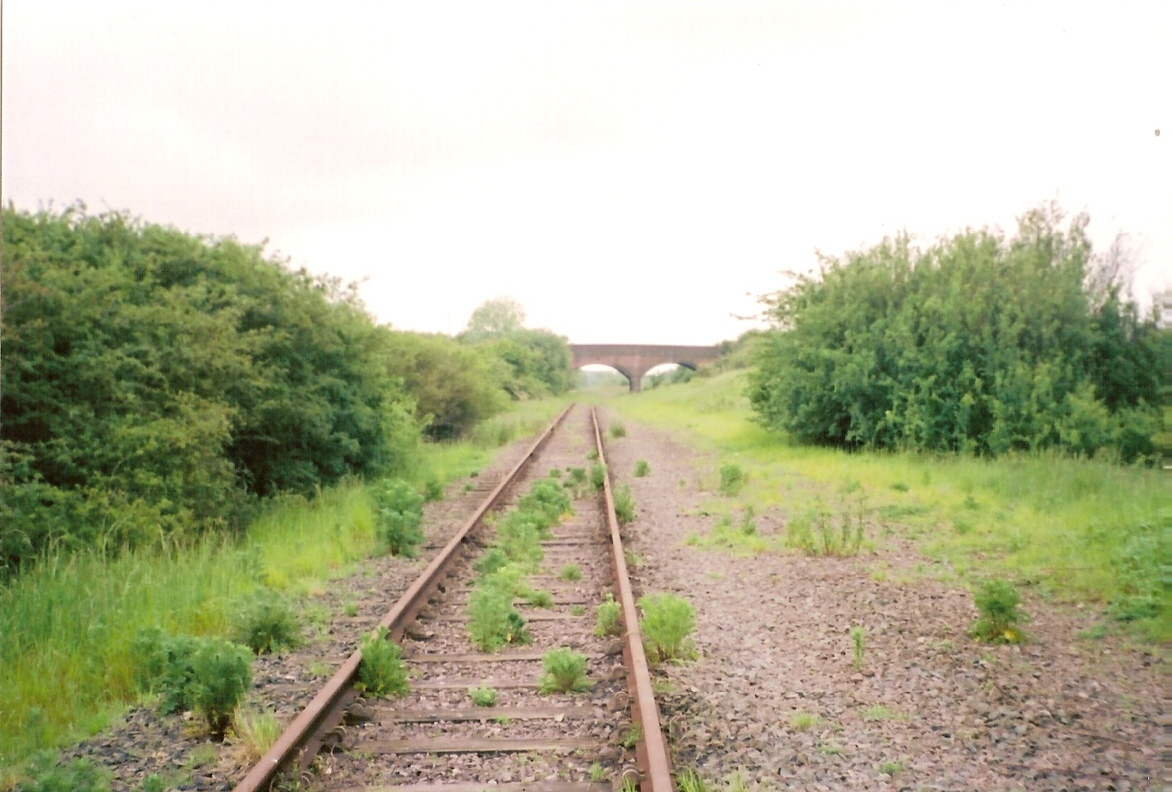
Dilapidated condition of the track (February 2006), looking towards road bridge between Newton Longville and Whaddon (51.978387, -0.786477).

After the partial closure, portions of the route continued as the Oxford–Bicester line and the Bletchley –Bedford Marston Vale line. Beginning in 2015, work to re-establish the route began; it hoped that the two university cities will be connected by rail again (as the East West Main Line) before the end of the 2030s.

== List of Varsity line station locations and dates ==
The Varsity Line and the lines it meets, as of 2008. Closed, disused and freight-only sections are in blue.

- Oxford; opened 20 May 1851; later Oxford Rewley Road; closed 1 October 1951, when service diverted to former GWR station.
- Oxford North Junction; convergence from GWR line; from 1940.
- Wolvercote; opened 9 October 1905; close 1 January 1917; reopened 5 May 1919; closed 25 October 1926; in the earliest days the station was named Woolvercot; the nearby GWR station was named Wolvercot.
- Yarnton Loop Junction; diverging junction; 1854 – 1863.
- Oxford Road Junction; convergence of spur from Handborough; 1854 – 1965; renamed Banbury Road Junction about 1950 to avoid confusion with the junction at Reading.
- Oxford Road; opened 2 December 1850 as temporary terminus; closed 20 May 1851, when the line was extended to Oxford; reopened 9 October 1905; closed 1 January 1917; reopened 5 May 1919; closed 25 October 1926.
- (Oxford Parkway; opened 25 October 2015 (on reopened Oxford–Bicester section, so after Varsity Line had ceased operation)
- Islip; opened 1 October 1850; closed 1 January 1968. (Reopened 13 May 1989.)
- Oddington; opened 1 October 1850; closed January 1851; reopened 9 October 1905; closed 1 January 1917; reopened 5 May 1919; closed 25 October 1926.
- Charlton; opened 9 October 1905; closed 1 January 1917; reopened 5 May 1919; closed 25 October 1926.
- Wendlebury; opened 9 October 1905; closed 1 January 1917; reopened 5 May 1919; closed 25 October 1926.
- Bicester; opened 1 October 1850; renamed Bicester London Road 1954; closed 1 January 1968. {Reopened as Bicester Town 11 May 1987; renamed Bicester Village 12 March 2015.)
- Gavray Junction; divergence towards Princes Risborough.
- Launton; opened 1 October 1850; closed 1 January 1968.
- Marsh Gibbon and Poundon; opened 2 August 1880; closed 1 January 1968.
- Claydon LNE Junction; trailing junction from Great Central main line; 1940 – .
- Claydon: opened 1 May 1850; closed 1 January 1968.
- Verney Junction; opened 23 September 1868; closed 1 January 1968. Originally Claydon Junction before station opened; converging junction from Buckingham 1856 – 1966; diverging junction to Aylesbury 1868 – 1947.
- Winslow; opened 1 May 1850; closed 1 January 1968.
- Swanbourne; opened October 1851; closed 1 January 1968.
- Bletchley; London and Birmingham Railway station; still open; flyover 1962 – .
- Fenny Stratford; opened 18 November 1846. still open
- Bow Brickhill; opened 1 December 1905; closed 1 January 1917; reopened 5 May 1919; still open.
- Woburn; opened 18 November 1846; renamed Woburn Sands 1860; still open.
- Aspley Guise; opened 1 December 1905; closed 1 January 1917; reopened 5 May 1919; still open.
- Husborne Crawley; opened 1 December 1905; closed 1 January 1917; reopened 5 May 1919; closed 5 May 1941.
- Ridgmont; opened 18 November 1846; still open.
- Lidlington; opened 18 November 1846; still open.
- Marston; opened 18 November 1846; shortly renamed Ampthill; renamed Millbrook 1877; still open.
- Wootton Pillinge; opened 1 December 1850; closed 1 January 1917; reopened 5 May 1919; renamed Stewartby 1935; still open.
- Wootton Broadmead; opened 1 December 1850; closed 1 January 1917; reopened 5 May 1919; closed 5 May 1941.
- Kempston Hardwick; opened 1 December 1905; closed 1 January 1917; reopened 5 May 1919; still open.
- Kempston & Elstow; opened 1 December 1905; closed 1 January 1917; reopened 5 May 1919; closed 5 May 1941.
- Bedford; opened 18 November 1846; relocated 1 August 1862; renamed Bedford St Johns 1924. (Relocated northwards on line towards Midland Road station 14 May 1984.)
- Goldington Siding; connection to Goldington Power Station; closed 1981.
- Willington; opened 1 May 1903; closed 1 January 1968.
- Blunham; opened 7 July 1862; closed 1 January 1968.
- Girtford Halt; opened 1 January 1938; closed 17 November 1940.
- Sandy West Junction; diverging junction to north curve 1940 – ?
- Sandy; Sandy & Potton Railway station; opened 9 November 1857; closed December 1861; reopened by LNWR 7 July 1862;closed 1 January 1968.
- Potton; Sandy & Potton Railway station; opened 9 November 1857; closed December 1861. LNWR station opened 7 July 1862; closed 1 January 1968.
- Gamlingay; opened 7 July 1862; closed 1 January 1968.
- Old North Road; opened 7 July 1862; closed 1 January 1968.
- Lords Bridge; opened 7 July 1862; closed 1 January 1968.
- Cambridge; Eastern Counties Railway station; still open.

== See also ==
- Rail transport in Great Britain
