= Aylesbury Vale District Council elections =

Local government elections in Buckinghamshire, England

Map showing the composition of Aylesbury Vale District Council as of the last election in 2015. Conservatives in blue, Liberal Democrats in yellow, UK Independence Party in purple, Labour in red and Independents in grey.

Aylesbury Vale District Council was the council for the non-metropolitan district of Aylesbury Vale in Buckinghamshire, England, which existed as a local government area from 1974 to 2020. The council was elected every four years from 1973 until 2015, with the last by-election for a vacant council position held on 7 March 2019. At the time of its abolition, the council had 59 councillors, elected from 33 wards.

== Political control ==
From the first election to the council in 1973 until its merger into Buckinghamshire Council in 2020, political control of the council was held by the following parties:

Party in control	Years
Independent	1973–1976
No overall control	1976–1979
Conservative	1979–1991
No overall control	1991–1995
Liberal Democrats	1995–1999
No overall control	1999–2003
Conservative	2003–2020

=== Leadership ===
Following the Local Government Act 2000, political leadership was provided by the leader of the council. The leaders from 2001 until the council's abolition in 2020 were:

Councillor	Party	From	To
John Cartwright	Conservative	9 May 2001	11 Sep 2013
Neil Blake	Conservative	11 Sep 2013	28 Jun 2018
Angela Macpherson	Conservative	18 Jul 2018	31 Mar 2020

== Council elections ==
Summary of the council composition after each council election, click on the year for full details of each election.

Year	Con	LD	UKIP	Lab	Ind	Lib	Ind Con	Residents	Grn	Notes
1973	11	0	0	12	31	0	0	0	0	
1976	29	2	0	9	16	0	1	1	0	New ward boundaries
1979	33	1	0	8	14	0	1	1	0	
1983	34	5	0	4	14	0	1	0	0	
1987	34	14	0	2	8	0	0	0	0	
1991	28	21	0	1	7	1	0	0	0	District boundary changes took place but the number of seats remained the same
1995	12	33	0	5	8	0	0	0	0	
1999	24	26	0	1	7	0	0	0	0	
2003	30	25	0	0	4	0	0	0	0	New ward boundaries increased the number of seats by 1
2007	37	21	0	0	1	0	0	0	0	Some new ward boundaries
2011	37	16	3	2	1	0	0	0	0	
2015	43	9	4	2	1	0	0	0	0	New ward boundaries
Current	38	12	0	2	1	0	2	3	1	Final composition after by-elections and defections/resignations

== District result maps ==
2003 results map

2007 results map

2011 results map

2015 results map

== By-election results ==
By-elections occur when seats become vacant between council elections. Below is a summary of recent by-elections; full by-election results can be found by clicking on the by-election name.

By-election	Date	Incumbent party	Winning party
Newton Longville	12 June 1997	Liberal Democrats	Independent
Stone	11 September 1997	Liberal Democrats	Conservative
Bedgrove	27 November 1997	Liberal Democrats	Conservative
Meadowcroft	27 November 1997	Liberal Democrats	Liberal Democrats
Haddenham	2 April 1998	Liberal Democrats	Liberal Democrats
Gatehouse	25 June 1998	Liberal Democrats	Liberal Democrats
Mandeville	16 July 1998	Labour	Liberal Democrats
Oakley	1 October 1998	Conservative	Conservative
Luffield Abbey	26 November 1998	Liberal Democrats	Conservative
Wing	4 May 2000	Liberal Democrats	Conservative
Mandeville	26 October 2000	Liberal Democrats	Liberal Democrats
Bedgrove	13 December 2001	Liberal Democrats	Conservative
Meadowcroft	27 June 2002	Liberal Democrats	Liberal Democrats
Quarrendon	6 November 2003	Liberal Democrats	Liberal Democrats
Winslow	25 March 2004	Conservative	Conservative
Buckingham South	18 November 2004	Conservative	Conservative
Stewkley	2 February 2006	Conservative	Conservative
Gatehouse	27 July 2006	Liberal Democrats	Liberal Democrats
Aylesbury Central	11 February 2010	Liberal Democrats	Liberal Democrats
Luffield Abbey	11 February 2010	Conservative	Conservative
Oakfield by-election	3 October 2013	Liberal Democrats	Liberal Democrats
Gatehouse by-election	11 December 2014	Liberal Democrats	Liberal Democrats
Southcourt by-election	11 December 2014	Labour	Liberal Democrats
Grendon Underwood and Brill by-election	23 December 2015	Conservative	Conservative
Elmhurst by-election	6 April 2017	UKIP	Liberal Democrats
Wendover and Halton by-election	4 May 2017	Conservative	Conservative
Riverside by-election	17 August 2017	Conservative	Conservative
Southcourt by-election	17 August 2017	Liberal Democrats	Liberal Democrats
Central and Walton by-election	22 March 2018	Conservative	Liberal Democrats
Quainton by-election	3 May 2018	Conservative	Liberal Democrats
Haddenham and Stone by-election	7 March 2019	Conservative	Green

=== 1995-1999 ===
Newton Longville By-Election 12 June 1997
Party	Candidate	Votes	%	±%
Independent		388	54.2	+54.2
Liberal Democrats		236	33.0	−23.5
Labour		92	12.8	+12.8
Majority		152	21.2	
Turnout		716	47.0	
Independent gain from Liberal Democrats		Swing		

Stone By-Election 11 September 1997
Party	Candidate	Votes	%	±%
Conservative		492	55.8	+33.1
Liberal Democrats		273	30.1	−4.5
Labour		117	13.3	+4.1
Majority		219	25.7	
Turnout		882	29.0	
Conservative gain from Liberal Democrats		Swing		

Luffield Abbey By-Election 27 November 1997
Party	Candidate	Votes	%	±%
Conservative		830	46.2	+13.2
Liberal Democrats		638	35.5	−10.5
Labour		160	8.9	−12.1
Majority		192	10.7	
Turnout		1,628	31.0	
Conservative gain from Liberal Democrats		Swing		

Meadowcroft By-Election 27 November 1997
Party	Candidate	Votes	%	±%
Liberal Democrats		263	43.1	−11.3
Labour		193	31.6	+0.1
Conservative		154	25.2	+11.1
Majority		70	11.5	
Turnout		610	12.0	
Liberal Democrats hold		Swing		

Haddenham By-Election 2 April 1998
Party	Candidate	Votes	%	±%
Liberal Democrats		949	55.8	+2.7
Conservative		483	28.4	−2.8
Labour		161	9.5	−5.6
Independent		109	6.4	+6.4
Majority		466	27.4	
Turnout		1,702	42.8	
Liberal Democrats hold		Swing		

Gatehouse By-Election 25 June 1998
Party	Candidate	Votes	%	±%
Liberal Democrats		305	47.9	−1.1
Conservative		248	38.9	+22.7
Labour		83	13.0	−17.7
Majority		57	9.0	
Turnout		636	24.9	
Liberal Democrats hold		Swing		

Mandeville By-Election 16 July 1998
Party	Candidate	Votes	%	±%
Liberal Democrats		498	48.3	+6.5
Conservative		313	30.3	+17.4
Labour		221	21.4	−12.9
Majority		185	18.0	
Turnout		1,032	17.1	
Liberal Democrats gain from Labour		Swing		

Oakley By-Election 1 October 1998
Party	Candidate	Votes	%	±%
Conservative		412	52.9	+3.0
Liberal Democrats		212	27.2	+7.8
Labour		155	19.9	−10.8
Majority		200	25.7	
Turnout		779	37.0	
Conservative hold		Swing		

Luffield Abbey By-Election 26 November 1998
Party	Candidate	Votes	%	±%
Conservative		211	44.3	−2.4
Liberal Democrats		208	43.7	−9.6
Labour		57	12.0	+12.0
Majority		150	0.6	
Turnout		476	33.6	
Conservative gain from Liberal Democrats		Swing		

=== 1999-2003 ===
Wing By-Election 3 May 2000
Party	Candidate	Votes	%	±%
Conservative		480	50.5	+5.1
Liberal Democrats		471	49.5	−5.1
Majority		9	1.0	
Turnout		951	44.3	
Conservative gain from Liberal Democrats		Swing		

Mandeville By-Election 26 October 2000
Party	Candidate	Votes	%	±%
Liberal Democrats		579	80.1	+27.4
Conservative		144	19.9	+0.5
Majority		435	60.2	
Turnout		723	12.2	
Liberal Democrats hold		Swing		

Bedgrove By-Election 13 December 2001
Party	Candidate	Votes	%	±%
Conservative		760	49.2	+7.8
Liberal Democrats		703	45.5	−13.1
Labour		82	5.3	+5.3
Majority		57	3.7	
Turnout		1,545	30.2	
Conservative gain from Liberal Democrats		Swing		

Meadowcroft By-Election 27 June 2002
Party	Candidate	Votes	%	±%
Liberal Democrats		521	47.2	+2.8
Conservative		283	25.6	+10.8
Independent		172	15.5	+0.6
Labour		128	11.6	−14.3
Majority		238	21.6	
Turnout		1,104	21.1	
Liberal Democrats hold		Swing		

=== 2003-2007 ===
Quarrendon By-Election 6 November 2003
Party	Candidate	Votes	%	±%
Liberal Democrats	Maria Butler	382	47.5	−10.7
Conservative	Wajid Kiani	248	30.8	+16.4
Aylesbury Resident's Action Party	David Davies	129	16.0	−11.4
Labour	Neal Bonham	46	5.7	+5.7
Majority		134	16.7	
Turnout		805	21.4	
Liberal Democrats hold		Swing		

Winslow By-Election 25 March 2004
Party	Candidate	Votes	%	±%
Conservative		885	54.2	+12.9
Liberal Democrats	Hannah Saul	577	35.4	+11.6
Independent		170	10.4	−24.5
Majority		308	18.8	
Turnout		1,632	37.5	
Conservative hold		Swing		

Buckingham South By-Election 18 November 2004
Party	Candidate	Votes	%	±%
Conservative	Huw Lewis	328	38.8	−7.8
Labour	Robin Stuchbury	285	33.7	+2.8
Liberal Democrats	Charles Burke	198	23.4	+0.9
Independent	Philipp Von Both	35	4.1	+4.1
Majority		43	5.1	
Turnout		846	21.7	
Conservative hold		Swing		

Stewkley By-Election 2 February 2006
Party	Candidate	Votes	%	±%
Conservative	Janet Blake	557	63.4	−7.2
Liberal Democrats	Llewellyn Monger	322	36.6	+36.6
Majority		235	26.8	
Turnout		879	40.2	
Conservative hold		Swing		

Gatehouse By-Election 27 July 2006
Party	Candidate	Votes	%	±%
Liberal Democrats	Tuffail Hussain	559	56.3	+3.5
Conservative	Jane Sale	343	34.6	+14.5
Residents	Suzanna Copcutt	90	9.1	−0.2
Majority		216	21.7	
Turnout		992	24.0	
Liberal Democrats hold		Swing		

=== 2007-2011 ===
Aylesbury Central By-Election 11 February 2010
Party	Candidate	Votes	%	±%
Liberal Democrats	Graham Webster	354	50.6	−1.9
Conservative	Mark Winn	213	30.5	−5.9
Labour	Michael Beall	67	9.6	+9.6
UKIP	Brian Adams	65	9.3	−1.9
Majority		141	20.1	
Turnout		699	26.9	
Liberal Democrats hold		Swing		

Luffield Abbey By-Election 11 February 2010
Party	Candidate	Votes	%	±%
Conservative	Pearl Lewis	343	49.7	−30.7
UKIP	John Russell	151	21.9	+21.9
Liberal Democrats	Ian Metherell	133	19.3	+19.3
Independent	Mark Benson	63	9.1	+9.1
Majority		192	27.8	
Turnout		690	33.4	
Conservative hold		Swing		

=== 2011-2015 ===
Oakfield By-Election 3 October 2013
Party	Candidate	Votes	%	±%
Liberal Democrats	Alison Harrison	406	34.8	+7.4
UKIP	Philip Gomm	325	27.8	+16.0
Conservative	Edward Sims	173	14.8	−10.0
Labour	Robert McNickle	145	12.4	−6.9
Independent	Patrick Martin	118	10.1	−6.5
Majority		81	7.0	
Turnout		1,167	28.7	−10.9
Liberal Democrats hold		Swing		

Gatehouse by-election 11 December 2014
Party	Candidate	Votes	%	±%
Liberal Democrats	Anders Christensen	295	35.6	−5.9
UKIP	Graham Cadle	267	32.2	+15.2
Conservative	Samantha North	113	13.6	−9.2
Labour	Lucio Tangi	113	13.6	−5.0
Green	Mary Hunt	28	3.4	+3.4
Independent	George Entecott	12	1.4	+1.4
Majority		28	3.4	
Turnout		828	17.7	−15.3
Liberal Democrats hold		Swing		

Southcourt by-election 11 December 2014
Party	Candidate	Votes	%	±%
Liberal Democrats	Peter Agoro	429	42.3	+6.3
UKIP	Brian Adams	266	26.2	+12.1
Labour	Mark Bateman	175	17.2	−12.2
Conservative	Sarah Sproat	112	11.0	−9.4
Green	Jedrze Kulig	33	3.3	+3.3
Majority		163	16.1	N/A
Turnout		1,015	21.0	−11.0
Liberal Democrats gain from Labour		Swing		

=== 2015-2020 ===
Grendon Underwood and Brill By-Election 23 December 2015
Party	Candidate	Votes	%	±%
Conservative	Cameron Branston	326	43.5	−11.2
Liberal Democrats	Julian Newman	275	36.7	+25.8
UKIP	Gary Good	148	19.8	−2.1
Majority		51	6.8	
Turnout		749		
Conservative hold		Swing		

Elmhurst by-election 6 April 2017
Party	Candidate	Votes	%	±%
Liberal Democrats	Susan Morgan	785	63.5	+37.9
Labour	Gary Paxton	151	12.2	−10.0
Conservative	Ammer Raheel	147	11.9	−9.3
UKIP	Philip Gomm	111	9.0	−14.4
Green	Nigel Foster	43	3.5	−4.2
Majority		634	51.3	
Turnout		1,244	27	
Liberal Democrats gain from UKIP		Swing		

Wendover and Halton By-Election 4 May 2017
Party	Candidate	Votes	%	±%
Conservative	Richard Newcombe	1,240	50.5	+8.5
Labour	Cath Collier	417	17.0	+17.0
Liberal Democrats	Ashley Morgan	298	12.1	−2.6
UKIP	Des Anning	273	11.1	−13.5
Green	Tom Hodge	227	9.2	−9.5
Majority		823	33.5	
Turnout		2,455		
Conservative hold		Swing		

Riverside By-Election 17 August 2017
Party	Candidate	Votes	%	±%
Conservative	Ashley Waite	301	34.7	+3.7
Liberal Democrats	Jason Bingley	286	32.9	+17.4
Labour	John Cowell	210	24.2	+6.5
UKIP	Phil Gomm	48	5.5	−30.3
Green	Mary Hodgskiss	23	2.6	+2.6
Majority		15	1.7	
Turnout		868		
Conservative hold		Swing		

Southcourt By-Election 17 August 2017
Party	Candidate	Votes	%	±%
Liberal Democrats	Sally-Anne Jarvis	456	37.3	+8.4
Conservative	Akhmad Hussain	386	31.5	+9.6
Labour	Ansar Gulzar	270	22.1	−0.5
Green	Julie Atkins	58	4.7	−1.0
UKIP	Geoffrey Baile	54	4.4	−16.5
Majority		70	5.7	
Turnout		1,224		
Liberal Democrats hold		Swing		

Central and Walton By-Election 22 March 2018
Party	Candidate	Votes	%	±%
Liberal Democrats	Waheed Raja	551	40.9	+18.1
Conservative	Lou Redding	425	31.5	−1.1
Labour	Philip Jacques	267	19.8	−0.9
Green	Matt Williams	61	4.5	−4.0
Independent	Kyle Michael	44	3.3	+3.3
Majority		126	9.3	
Turnout		1,348		
Liberal Democrats gain from Conservative		Swing		

Quainton By-Election 3 May 2018
Party	Candidate	Votes	%	±%
Liberal Democrats	Scott Raven	564	46.4	+46.4
Conservative	Steven Walker	492	40.5	−14.1
Labour	Maxine Myatt	113	9.3	+9.3
Green	Deborah Lovatt	47	3.9	+3.9
Majority		72	5.9	
Turnout		1,216		
Liberal Democrats gain from Conservative		Swing		

Haddenham and Stone By-Election 7 March 2019
Party	Candidate	Votes	%	±%
Green	David Lyons	1,210	50.8	+34.6
Conservative	Mark Bale	781	32.8	−7.9
Liberal Democrats	Jim Brown	333	14.0	+2.3
Labour	Jennifer Tuffley	59	2.5	+2.5
Majority		429	18.0	
Turnout		2,383		
Green gain from Conservative		Swing		
