= Buckingham Old Gaol =

Historic building in Buckingham, England

Buckingham Old Gaol Museum
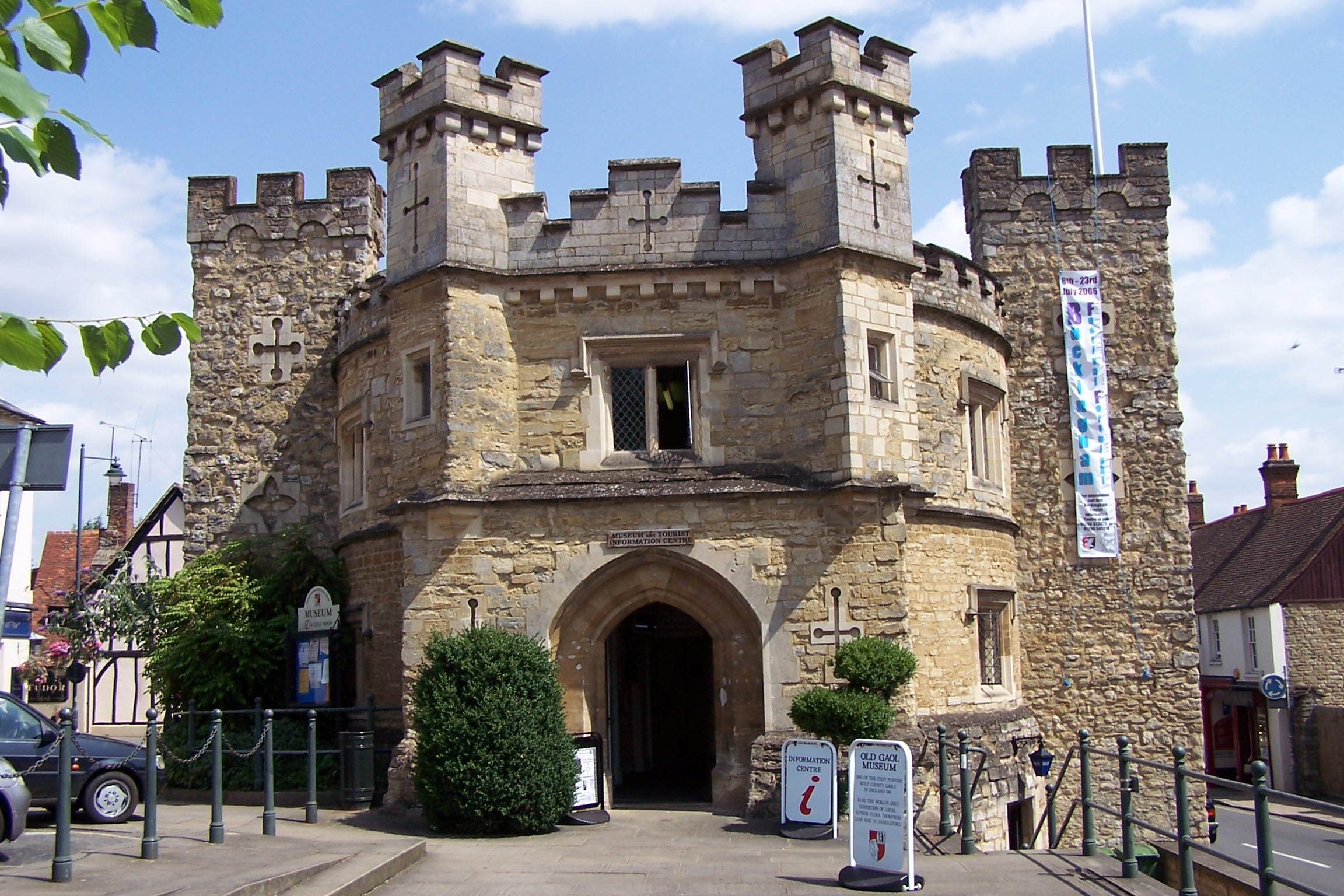
- Established: 1993
- Location: Buckingham, England
- Coordinates: 52.00055°N 0.98752°W
- Type: Local history
- Website: www.buckinghamoldgaol.org.uk

Buckingham Old Gaol, sometimes known as Lord Cobham's Castle, is a historic building in Buckingham, the former county town of Buckinghamshire, England.

The building is now a museum, shop and tourist information centre and is located on Market Hill in the town centre. It is a member of the Milton Keynes Heritage Association and the Association of Independent Museums.

== History ==
Following an Act of Parliament passed on 30 June 1747 (21 George 2 c.12, known as Lord Cobham's Act), the original prison building was erected in 1748. The bulk of funding was from Richard Temple, fourth baronet of Stowe (1675–1749), who had been previously MP for Buckingham. It was built in the Gothic style. One of the prisoners jailed here was the prize fighter Simon Byrne. He was tried at the Buckingham Assizes in 1830 for the manslaughter of another prize fighter, Alexander M'Kay.

The rounded front of the building was added in 1839, designed by George Gilbert Scott, a local architect. This provided accommodation for the jailer and became known as the Keeper's Lodge. For around 60 years, the Old Gaol acted as the police station for Buckingham, until a new police station was built a short distance away on Moreton Road. In 1891 it became a fire station, and the C Company of the 1st Bucks Rifles rented part of the building for their armoury from 1892 until 1926. In 1907, public toilets were installed.

In the 1950s, it became an antiques shop and café. In 1974, the Aylesbury Vale District Council took over responsibility for the building. Buckingham Heritage Trust was formed in 1985 to save the building and it opened as a museum in 1993, together with a tourist information centre. The Old Gaol Museum obtained finance from the Heritage Lottery Fund to add a glass roof over the original prisoners' exercise yard in 2000.

== Museum ==
The museum is open to the public and tells the story of Buckingham and rural life, including the Flora Thompson Collection (author of Lark Rise to Candleford) and Buckinghamshire Military Trust exhibits. A number of the original cells form part of the museum exhibits.

The Buckinghamshire Military Museum Trust is based at the museum, and houses its collections there. In addition to arms, regalia, and other military memorabilia, the Buckinghamshire Military Museum Trust also holds a small collection of military musical instruments, including early examples of rope-tensioned side drums.

== Gallery ==
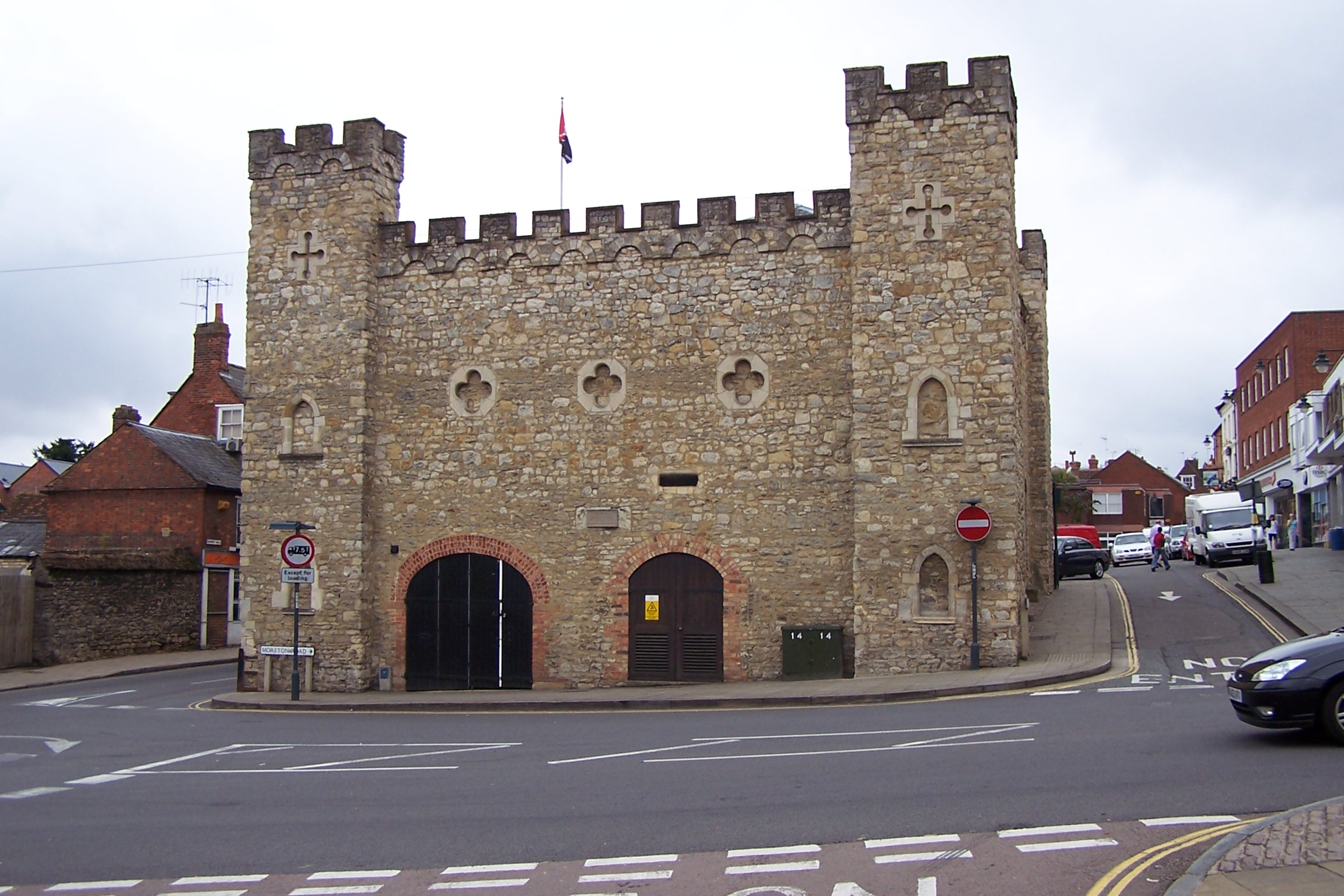
Rear view of the Old Gaol.

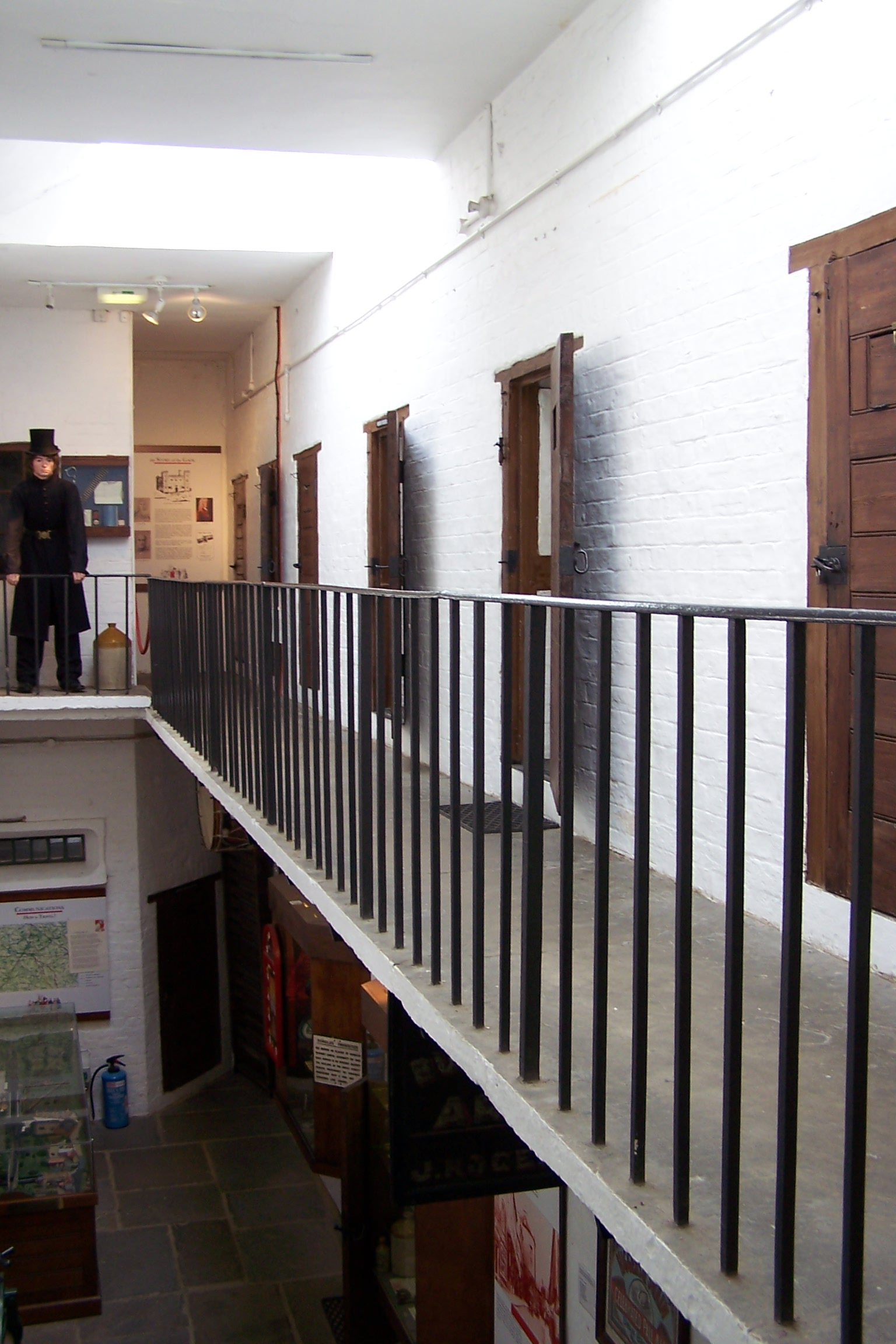
Cells in the jail.

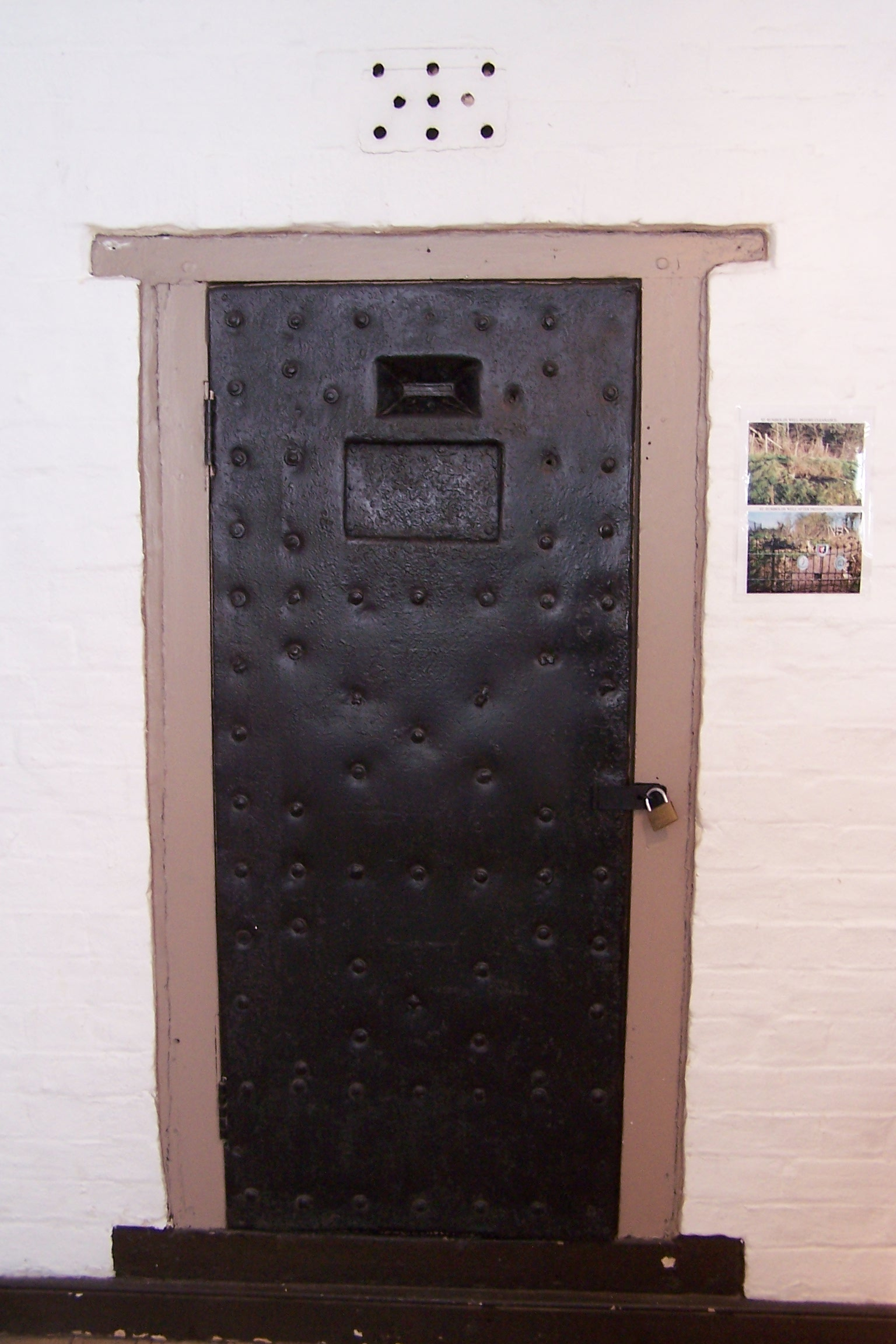
Cell door in the jail.
