= Ben Everitt =

British Conservative politician (born 1979)

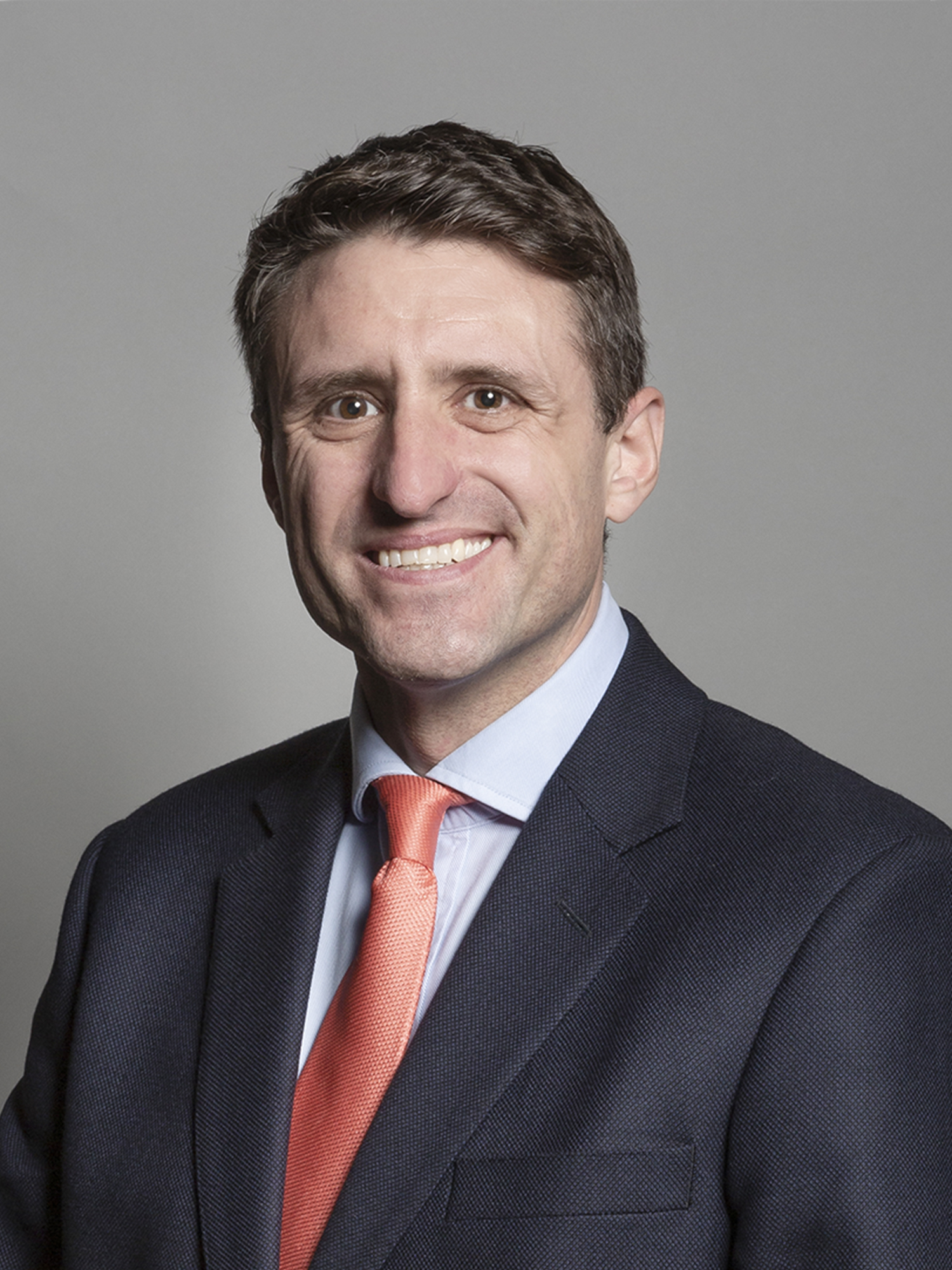
- Official portrait, 2019

Member of Parliament for Milton Keynes North
- In office 12 December 2019 – 30 May 2024
- Preceded by: Mark Lancaster
- Succeeded by: Chris Curtis

Personal details
- Born: Benjamin William Everitt; 22 November 1979 (age 46) Grantham, Lincolnshire, England
- Party: Conservative
- Spouse: Emma Skinner
- Children: 3
- Occupation: Politician
- Website: www.beneveritt.com

Benjamin William Everitt (born 22 November 1979) is a British Conservative Party politician who served as the Member of Parliament (MP) for Milton Keynes North from 2019 to 2024.

== Early life and career ==
Everitt was born in Grantham, Lincolnshire, in 1979 to parents Peter and Rosemary Everitt. He attended The King's School in Grantham, and then Durham University, where he obtained a BSc. Everitt worked as a management consultant for Deloitte from 2009 to 2012. He was latterly head of strategy for the Institute of Chartered Accountants in England and Wales from 2012 to 2020.

== Political career ==
At the 2015 local elections, Everitt was elected to Aylesbury Vale District Council, representing Great Brickhill and Newton Longville ward for the Conservatives. He was elected as the MP for the marginal Milton Keynes North constituency at the 2019 general election, succeeding the former Conservative MP Mark Lancaster. In 2020, Aylesbury Vale became part of the newly created Buckinghamshire Council, with Everitt serving as a councillor on the new unitary authority until the inaugural elections in May 2021.

In 2020, Everitt became chairman of the All-Party Parliamentary Group for Housing Market and Housing Delivery. He also became chair of the All-Party Parliamentary Group on Connected and Automated Mobility with his Milton Keynes North constituency being home to numerous automated mobility trials including driverless cars.

Everitt is a supporter of Brexit. He campaigned for a new hospital in Milton Keynes, alongside fellow Conservative MP Iain Stewart, who represents Milton Keynes South, but was unable to persuade the government to approve the project.

In November 2020, Everitt was one of more than 50 MPs who signed a letter calling on a proposed pay rise for MPs to be scrapped due to the coronavirus pandemic. The pay rise was scrapped in December.

Everitt has called on the Chancellor, Rishi Sunak, to extend the Stamp Duty holiday which had been put in place to support movers and the housing market during the pandemic.

In the 2024 United Kingdom general election, he was defeated by Labour candidate Chris Curtis.

== Controversies ==
Everitt was criticised by opponents during the 2019 election campaign for allegedly staging a photo of himself picking up litter in the car park of the Conservative Club in Bletchley.

=== Transphobia ===
In May 2020, a tweet posted by Everitt in 2011 was shared on social media, in which he referred to the late Labour MP Tessa Jowell as looking like "a tranny with a hangover". He apologised for the remark.

=== Expenses ===
Everitt attracted media attention in 2021 as a result of an investigation into his second home expenses by the Independent Parliamentary Standards Authority following a complaint by a constituent as a result of official statistics showing that Everitt was among the top ten claimants of second home expenses out of 650 MPs despite his constituency being within a short commute of London.

The investigation found no evidence that Everitt had broken any rules, concluding that while he was claiming £2,800 per month rent from the taxpayer for a second family home in London despite his children not visiting the property during the 2020/21 financial year and his children being educated in Milton Keynes, this was within the rules.

== Post-parliamentary career ==
Since his defeat at the 2024 general election, Everitt has worked as a Director for MK Capital, and a Senior Partner at CRS Global Advisors.

== Personal life ==
He married Emma Skinner in 2006; the couple have a son and two daughters. He lists his recreations as "family, watching Rugby, drinking beer", and is a member of the United and Cecil Club.

Parliament of the United Kingdom
Preceded by Mark Lancaster	Member of Parliament for Milton Keynes North; 2019–present	Incumbent
