= 2003 Aylesbury Vale District Council election =

2003 UK local government election

Map of the results of the 2003 Aylesbury Vale council election. Conservatives in blue, Liberal Democrats in yellow and Independents in grey.

Elections to Aylesbury Vale District Council were held on 1 May 2003. The whole council was up for election with boundary changes since the last election in 1999 increasing the number of councillors by 1. The Conservative Party gained overall control of the council from no overall control.

== Results ==
Aylesbury Vale local election result 2003
Party	Seats	Gains	Losses	Net gain/loss	Seats %	Votes %	Votes	+/−
Conservative	30			+3	50.8	48.2	33,685	
Liberal Democrats	25			+1	42.4	40.0	27,968	
Independent	4			-2	6.8	5.2	3,660	
Labour	0			-1	0	5.5	3,878	
Residents Action Party	0			0	0	0.9	604	
UKIP	0			0	0	0.2	126	

5 Conservative candidates were unopposed.

=== By ward ===
Aston Clinton (3)
Party	Candidate	Votes	%	±%
Conservative	William Chapple	1,723		
Conservative	Carole Paternoster	1,635		
Conservative	David Thompson	1,493		
Liberal Democrats	Sheelagh Nolan	809		
Turnout		5,660		

Aylesbury Central
Party	Candidate	Votes	%	±%
Liberal Democrats	Keith Turner	326	53.0	
Conservative	David Clarke	200	32.5	
Independent	Denis Gilford	89	14.5	
Majority		126	20.5	
Turnout		615		

Bedgrove (3)
Party	Candidate	Votes	%	±%
Liberal Democrats	Penelope Thorne	1,432		
Liberal Democrats	Julian Newman	1,404		
Liberal Democrats	Alan Sherwell	1,324		
Conservative	John Champion	1,239		
Conservative	June Toseland	1,188		
Conservative	Michael Arrowsmith	1,170		
Labour	Edna Ullmann	225		
Turnout		7,992		

Bierton
Party	Candidate	Votes	%	±%
Independent	Bernard Griffin	269	46.5	
Liberal Democrats	Ronald Letts	175	30.2	
Conservative	Alistair Doe	135	23.3	
Majority		94	16.3	
Turnout		579		

Brill
Party	Candidate	Votes	%	±%
Conservative	Valerie Baxter	580	53.6	
Labour	Joanna Dodsworth	256	23.7	
Liberal Democrats	Luke Croydon	246	22.7	
Majority		324	29.9	
Turnout		1,082		

Buckingham North (2)
Party	Candidate	Votes	%	±%
Conservative	Derrick Isham	630		
Conservative	Timothy Mills	521		
Liberal Democrats	Pauline Stevens	484		
Labour	Christine Strain-Clark	479		
Turnout		2,114		

Buckingham South (2)
Party	Candidate	Votes	%	±%
Conservative	Kenneth Liversedge	601		
Conservative	Hedley Cadd	574		
Labour	Robin Stutchbury	399		
Liberal Democrats	Hannah Saul	290		
Turnout		1,864		

Cheddington
Party	Candidate	Votes	%	±%
Liberal Democrats	Corry Cashman	558	58.7	
Conservative	Lesley Pollard	392	41.3	
Majority		166	17.4	
Turnout		950		

Coldharbour (3)
Party	Candidate	Votes	%	±%
Liberal Democrats	Paul Hughes	589		
Liberal Democrats	Chloe Willets	567		
Liberal Democrats	Zulifgar Ahmed	517		
Conservative	Philip Collinge	393		
Conservative	Andrew Huxley	376		
Conservative	Nicholas West	356		
Labour	Neal Bonham	198		
Independent	Christopher Card	80		
Turnout		3,076		

Edlesborough
Party	Candidate	Votes	%	±%
Conservative	Pauline Hannelly	457	59.8	
Liberal Democrats	John Brown	307	40.2	
Majority		150	19.6	
Turnout		764		

Elmhurst and Watermead (3)
Party	Candidate	Votes	%	±%
Liberal Democrats	Raj Khan	936		
Conservative	Abdul Khaliq	746		
Conservative	Jason Bray	725		
Liberal Democrats	Maria Butler	715		
Liberal Democrats	Jennifer Puddefoot	690		
Conservative	Ian West	647		
Labour	Michael Rowlinson	352		
Turnout		4,811		

Gatehouse (2)
Party	Candidate	Votes	%	±%
Liberal Democrats	Patricia Jamieson	474		
Liberal Democrats	Terence Sherwin	439		
Conservative	Jane Sale	180		
Labour	Philip McGoldrick	160		
Conservative	Catherine West	160		
Labour	Malcolm Pike	141		
Residents Action Party	Frank Merrick	83		
Residents Action Party	Martin Hill	75		
Turnout		1,712		

Great Brickhill
Party	Candidate	Votes	%	±%
Conservative	Neil Blake	480	57.1	
Liberal Democrats	Geoffrey Twiss	268	31.9	
Labour	Brian Ambler	92	11.0	
Majority		212	25.2	
Turnout		840		

Great Horwood
Party	Candidate	Votes	%	±%
Conservative	Beville Stanier	unopposed		

Grendon Underwood
Party	Candidate	Votes	%	±%
Conservative	John Cartwright	unopposed		

Haddenham (3)
Party	Candidate	Votes	%	±%
Liberal Democrats	Neil Stuart	1,281		
Conservative	Judith Brandis	1,215		
Independent	Chloe Lambert	1,083		
Conservative	Brian Foster	1,049		
Liberal Democrats	Richard Moore	991		
Conservative	Eric Lambden	850		
Liberal Democrats	Mary Baldwin	849		
Turnout		7,318		

Long Crendon (2)
Party	Candidate	Votes	%	±%
Conservative	David Smith	1,083		
Conservative	Michael Edmonds	1,064		
Liberal Democrats	Elaine Stuart	442		
Labour	Margaret Liggett	374		
Turnout		2,953		

Luffield Abbey
Party	Candidate	Votes	%	±%
Conservative	Alison Walsh	555	76.1	
Liberal Democrats	Laura Takuma	174	23.9	
Majority		381	52.2	
Turnout		729		

Mandeville and Elm Farm (3)
Party	Candidate	Votes	%	±%
Liberal Democrats	Denise Summers	828		
Liberal Democrats	Peter Vernon	764		
Liberal Democrats	Niknam Hussain	676		
Conservative	Myles Grandison	467		
Conservative	Thomas Wilkins	447		
Conservative	Hugh Williams	445		
Labour	Henry Gardner	198		
Labour	Shirley Raw	195		
UKIP	Gerard McCormack	126		
Turnout		4,146		

Marsh Gibbon
Party	Candidate	Votes	%	±%
Liberal Democrats	Ian Metherell	421	53.3	
Conservative	Michael Hall	369	46.7	
Majority		52	6.6	
Turnout		790		

Newton Longville
Party	Candidate	Votes	%	±%
Independent	Pamela Pearce	493	52.6	
Conservative	Sally Judd	295	31.5	
Liberal Democrats	Llewellyn Monger	149	15.9	
Majority		198	21.1	
Turnout		937		

Oakfield (2)
Party	Candidate	Votes	%	±%
Liberal Democrats	Stephen Patrick	711		
Liberal Democrats	Glenda Reynolds	675		
Conservative	Jason Evans	229		
Conservative	Joseph Cook	222		
Turnout		1,837		

Pitstone
Party	Candidate	Votes	%	±%
Liberal Democrats	Avril Davies	537	68.8	
Conservative	Paul Garrad	244	31.2	
Majority		293	37.6	
Turnout		781		

Quainton
Party	Candidate	Votes	%	±%
Conservative	Sue Polhill	unopposed		

Quarrendon (2)
Party	Candidate	Votes	%	±%
Liberal Democrats	Raymond Ghent	400		
Liberal Democrats	Raymond Humm	366		
Residents Action Party	David Davies	188		
Residents Action Party	Elsie Davies	184		
Conservative	John Carter	99		
Conservative	Philip Still	82		
Turnout		1,319		

Southcourt (2)
Party	Candidate	Votes	%	±%
Liberal Democrats	Freda Roberts	627		
Liberal Democrats	David Ralph	456		
Independent	Alan Price	271		
Labour	Zard Khan	222		
Conservative	Louis Altman	109		
Conservative	Marion Dorrell	95		
Residents Action Party	Joanne Merrick	74		
Turnout		1,854		

Steeple Claydon
Party	Candidate	Votes	%	±%
Conservative	Edward Griffin	unopposed		

Stewkley
Party	Candidate	Votes	%	±%
Conservative	John Jennings	609	70.6	
Labour	William Lyttle	253	29.4	
Majority		356	41.2	
Turnout		862		

Tingewick
Party	Candidate	Votes	%	±%
Conservative	David Rowlands	651	73.3	
Liberal Democrats	Howard Mordue	237	26.7	
Majority		414	46.6	
Turnout		888		

Waddesdon
Party	Candidate	Votes	%	±%
Conservative	Margaret Morgan-Owen	unopposed		

Walton Court and Hawkslade (2)
Party	Candidate	Votes	%	±%
Liberal Democrats	Steven Kennell	515		
Liberal Democrats	Ranjula Takodra	452		
Conservative	Paul Milham	196		
Conservative	John Wiseman	189		
Labour	Gordon Richardson	126		
Independent	Albert McNicholls	117		
Labour	Tom Watt	105		
Turnout		1,700		

Weedon
Party	Candidate	Votes	%	±%
Conservative	Ashley Bond	380	62.1	
Liberal Democrats	Harold Newman	129	21.1	
Labour	Margaret Ewan	103	16.8	
Majority		251	41.0	
Turnout		612		

Wendover (3)
Party	Candidate	Votes	%	±%
Conservative	Christopher Richards	1,062		
Conservative	Judith Myers	1,061		
Conservative	Kevin McPartland	1,032		
Liberal Democrats	Christopher Peeler	944		
Liberal Democrats	Gordon Knight	940		
Liberal Democrats	Jane Rutland	933		
Turnout		5,972		

Wing
Party	Candidate	Votes	%	±%
Conservative	Dorothea Glover	521	65.1	
Liberal Democrats	Robert Lewis	279	34.9	
Majority		242	30.2	
Turnout		800		

Wingrave
Party	Candidate	Votes	%	±%
Independent	Peter Cooper	571	64.6	
Conservative	Colin Smart	313	35.4	
Majority		258	29.2	
Turnout		884		

Winslow (2)
Party	Candidate	Votes	%	±%
Conservative	Colin Ashendon	812		
Conservative	Angela Rowlands	784		
Independent	Christopher James	687		
Liberal Democrats	Sandra Monger	468		
Turnout		2,751		
