= Buckingham =

Town in Buckinghamshire, England

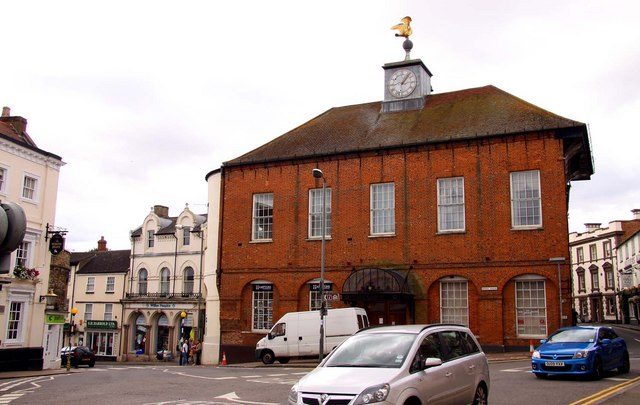
- Buckingham Town Hall

- Location within Buckinghamshire
- Buckingham (civil parish)
- Population: 14,294 (2021 census)
- OS grid reference: SP695335
  - London: 55 miles (89 km) SE
- Civil parish: Buckingham
- Unitary authority: Buckinghamshire Council
- Ceremonial county: Buckinghamshire
- Region: South East
- Country: England
- Sovereign state: United Kingdom
- Post town: Buckingham
- Postcode district: MK18
- Dialling code: 01280
- Police: Thames Valley
- Fire: Buckinghamshire
- Ambulance: South Central
- UK Parliament: Buckingham and Bletchley
- Website: Buckingham Town Council

Buckingham (/ˈbʌkɪŋəm/ BUK-ing-əm) is a market town in north Buckinghamshire, England, close to the borders with Northamptonshire and Oxfordshire. The civil parish of Buckingham had a population of 14,294 at the 2021 census. The town lies approximately 12 miles (19 km) west of Milton Keynes, 19 miles (31 km) south-east of Banbury and 24 miles (39 km) north-east of Oxford.

The town was the county town of Buckinghamshire from the 10th century, when it was made the capital of the newly-formed shire of Buckingham, until Aylesbury took over this role in the 18th century. Britain's first private university, the University of Buckingham, is based here.

== History ==
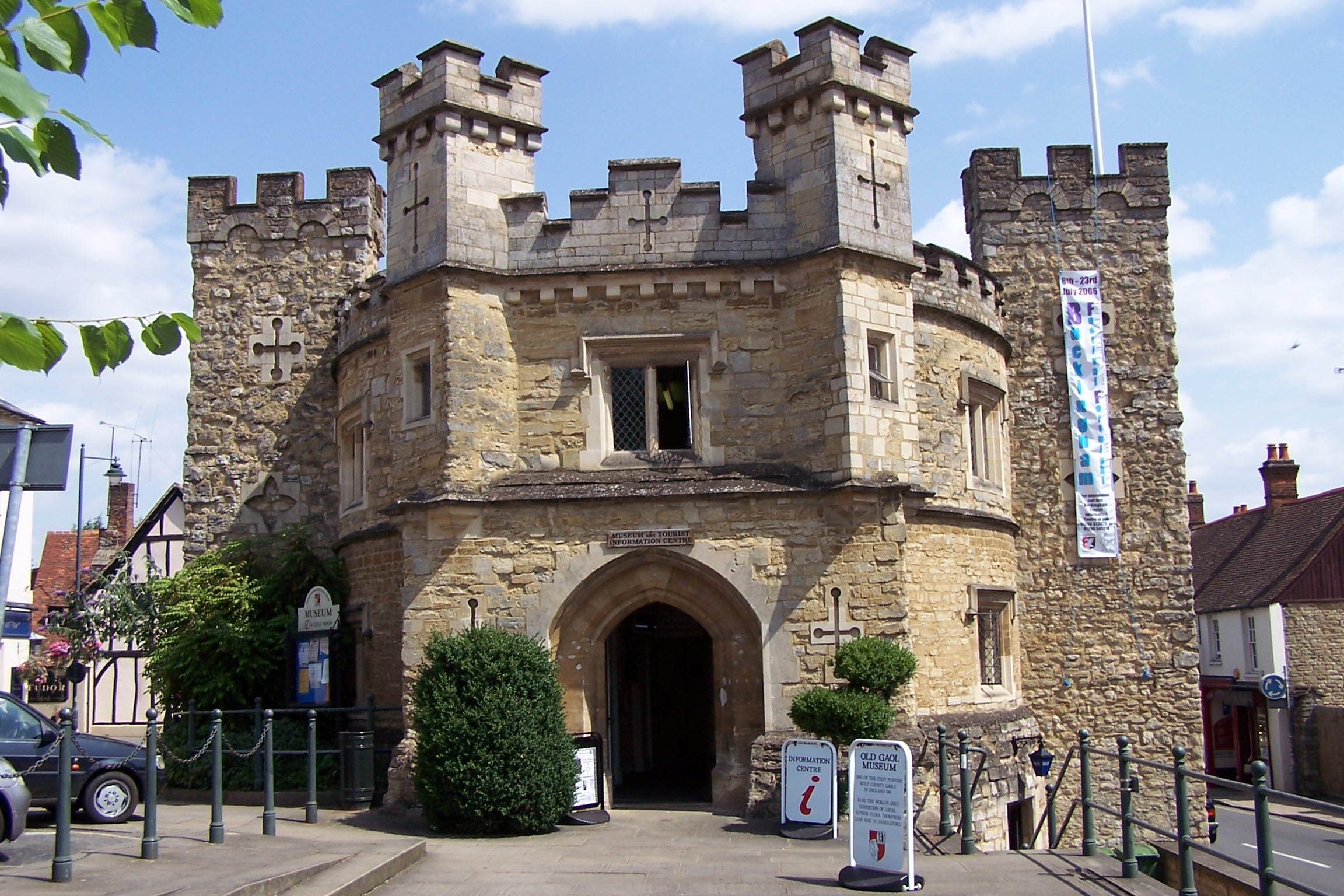
Old County Gaol in Buckingham, built 1748; it is now the Buckingham Old Gaol museum

Buckingham and the surrounding area has been settled for some time, with evidence of Roman settlement found in several sites close to the River Great Ouse; this included a temple south of the A421 at Bourton Grounds which was excavated in the 1960s and dated to the third century AD. A possible Roman building was identified at Castle Fields in the 19th century. Pottery, kiln furniture and areas of burning found at Buckingham industrial estate suggest it was the site of some early Roman pottery kilns.

In the seventh century, Buckingham (literally, "hemmed-in land of Bucca's people") is said to have been founded by Bucca, the leader of the first Anglo Saxon settlers. The first settlement was located around the top of a loop in the River Great Ouse, presently the Hunter Street campus of the University of Buckingham. Between the seventh and 11th centuries, the town of Buckingham regularly changed hands between the Saxons and the Danes; in particular, King Edward the Elder and a Saxon army encamped in Buckingham in 914 for four weeks, forcing local Danish Viking leaders to surrender. Subsequently, a fort was constructed at the location of the present Buckingham parish church.

The town is the first settlement referred to in the Buckinghamshire section of the Domesday Book of 1086. It was referred to as Buckingham with Bourton and the survey makes reference to 26 burgesses, 11 smallholders and one mill.

The town received its charter in 1554, when Queen Mary created the free Borough of Buckingham with boundaries extending from Thornborowe Bridge (now Thornborough) to Dudley Bridge and from Chackmore Bridge to Padbury Mill Bridge. The designated borough included a bailiff, twelve principal burgesses and a steward. Yeomanry House, the offices and home of the commanding officer of the Buckinghamshire Yeomanry, was built in the early 19th century.

The town suffered a significant fire that raged through the town centre on 15 March 1725, with the result that many streets of the town were destroyed including Castle Street, Castle Hill and the north side of Market Hill. The result was 138 dwellings, out of a total of 387 in the town at that time, were consumed in the fire. The current Georgian architecture on these streets today is a consequence of the fire, but the immediate aftermath was difficult for the town. Collections were made in surrounding towns such as Aylesbury and Wendover to help those made homeless; by 1730, only a third of the homes had been rebuilt. Due to many buildings being considered to be of historic interest, a number of them have been granted listed building status; these include the Grade I listed Castle House on West Street, which dates back to the 15th century. Buckingham Town Hall, which is Grade II* listed, dates to the late 18th century.

The municipal borough had a population of 1,816 in 1841. The town was connected to the London and North Western Railway by the Buckinghamshire Railway in 1850; the service ended in 1964.

In 1971, Buckinghamshire County Council set up the Buckingham Development Company with other local councils, and undertook a significant project to grow the town and provide a bypass, mainly to the south and east of the historic town centre. The population rose from just over 5,000 to 9,309 in 1991.

The town is said to be the final resting place of St Rumbold (also known as Saint Rumwold).

== Geography ==
The town is centred on the historic market place and contains many 18th-century buildings. There are three main roads crossing Buckingham, namely the A413, the A421 (the southern bypass) and the A422. Capability Brown's historic formal garden design at Stowe, on the A422 westbound, is an important attraction in the care of the National Trust.

There is a medieval well, known as St Rumbold's Well, on the south side of the dismantled railway which borders the town. The well, which is now dry for much of the year, was positioned to exploit the spring line below the crest of a north-facing slope overlooking the town.

Suburbs of Buckingham include Mount Pleasant, Page Hill, Bourton, Badgers, Linden Village, Castle Fields, Tingewick Road Estate and Lace Hill. Maids Moreton, a village on the north-eastern borders of the town has become contiguous with the Buckingham urban area. Nearby settlements include Winslow, Bicester, Brackley, Milton Keynes and Silverstone. Local villages in the immediate vicinity include Padbury and Gawcott to the south, Chackmore to the north and Shalstone to the north-west. It is also near to Stowe, the location of Stowe House, Stowe Gardens and Stowe School.

There is a degree confluence point on the edge of the town, at exactly 52°00′00″N 01°00′00″W.

=== Bourton ===
Bourton was a hamlet in the parish of Buckingham. The hamlet name is Old English in origin, and means 'fortified enclosure'. It is now an integral part of the town of Buckingham, with a road and old mill named Bourton still visible to visitors.

It was once the location of a great house that belonged to the Minshull family. In the English Civil War, the house was plundered by Parliamentarian forces. The house has long since disappeared.

=== Population ===
At the 2021 census, the population of the Buckingham civil paish, which excludes the contiguous parish of Maids Moreton, (Note: At the 2021 census, the population of Maids Moreton CP was 857.) was 14,294. At the 2011 census, the population of the parish was 12,043.

Census population of Buckingham parish
Census	Population	Female	Male	Households	Source
2001	11,572	5,887	5,685	4,459	
2011	12,043	6,063	5,980	4,741	
2021	14,294	7,348	6,946	5,908	

== Education ==
The town is home to the University of Buckingham, the oldest of the UK's six private universities. Like other UK universities, a large proportion of its students are from overseas.

The Buckinghamshire Council operates the Tripartite System of state secondary education. The local state secondary schools are the Royal Latin School (a grammar school) and the Buckingham School (a secondary modern). Stowe School and Akeley Wood School, just outside the town, are private schools.

There are four primary schools: one a community school and the other three academies, serving different areas of the town. Buckingham Primary School is the community primary and the three academies (Bourton Meadow Academy, George Grenville Academy and Lace Hill Academy) are all operated by Campfire Education Trust.

== Economy ==
The town is home to a number of industrial estates and technology parks housing high tech companies in the pharmaceutical, electronic, foods and composite materials fields, including Racelogic and Wipac.

Buckingham was home to the Thomas Rickett steam car, an innovative vehicle from 1860, though considered ahead of its time and only two are thought to have been made.

Most retail outlets are located in the town centre, with a variety of independent stores, cafes and restaurants, as well as national chains. The Hidden Quarter, located mainly in Well Street and Bridge Street, hosts a number of independent retailers. There are two banks in the town centre.

=== Town markets ===
Buckingham's historic street market has been in the town for over 600 years; it dates from the Charters granted by Queen Mary in 1554 and Charles II in 1664, giving the markets a unique heritage.

Street markets are held every Tuesday and Saturday. Regular and casual market traders offer a wide variety of products, including fish, fruit, vegetables, award-winning bread, household goods, tools, flowers and clothes. There is a flea market held every Saturday on the site of the town's former cattle pens, offering a wide selection of antiques, collectables and jewellery.

== Governance ==
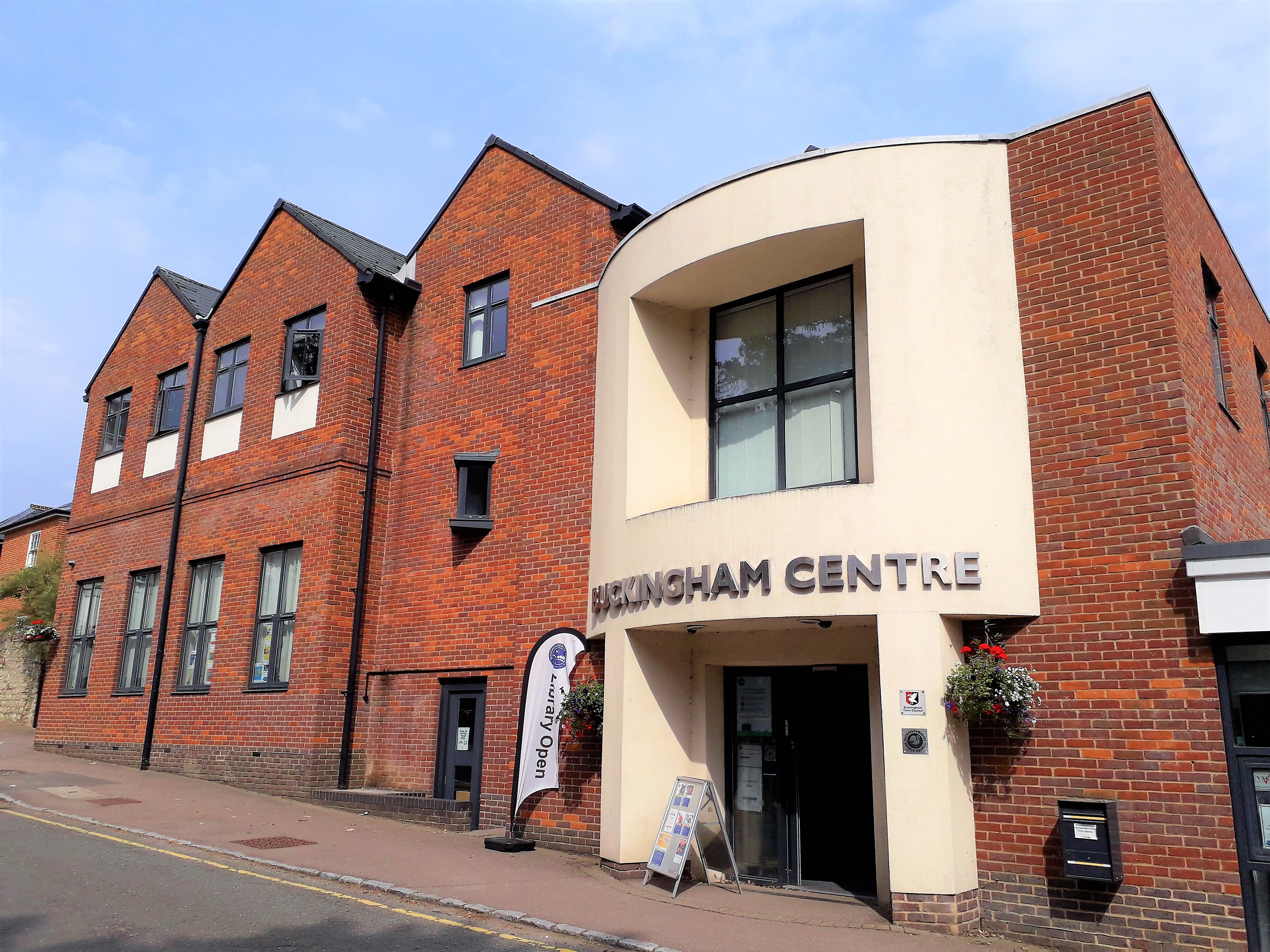
The Buckingham Centre, on Verney Close, contains offices of the town council, the area office of the county council and the library

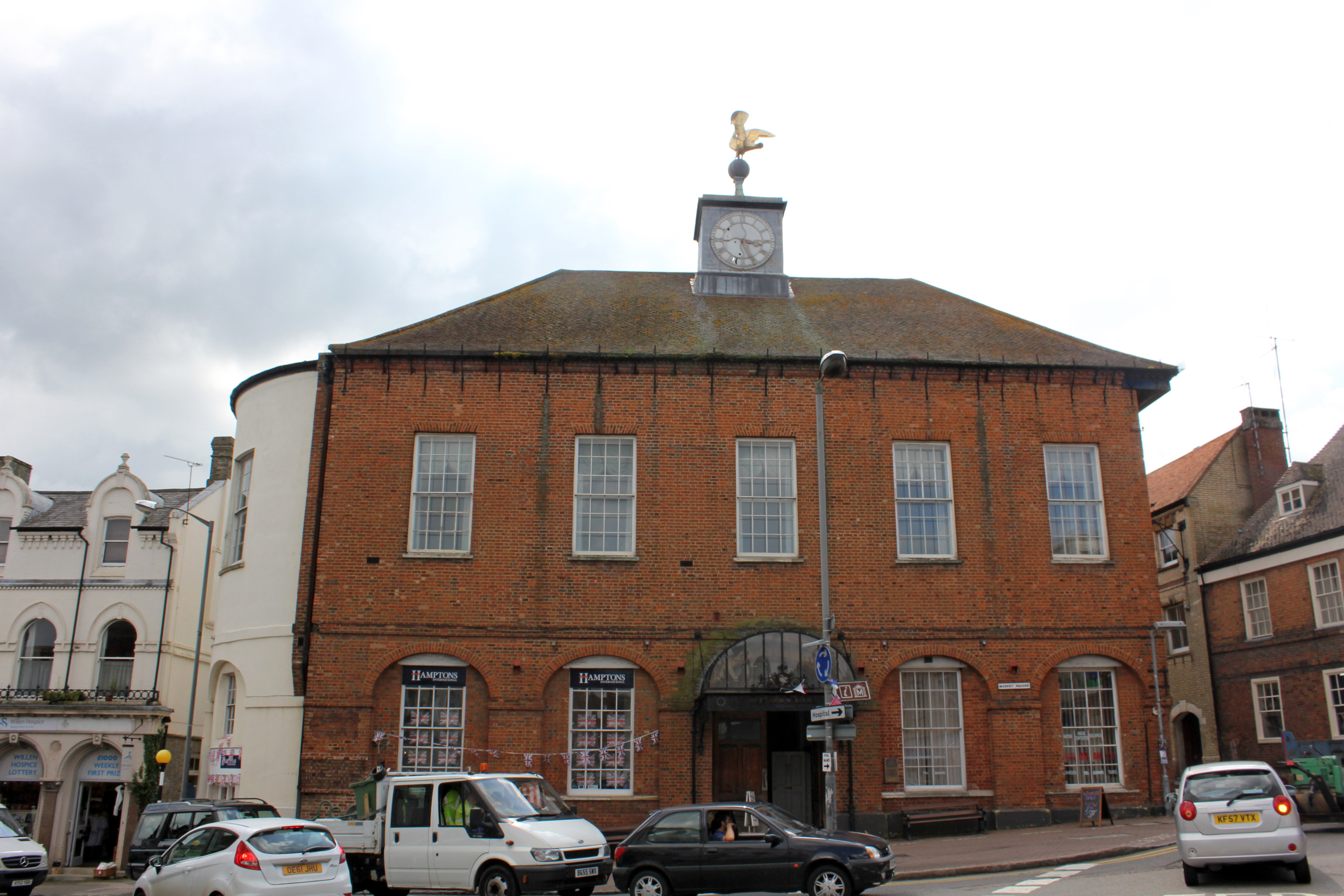
Buckingham Town Hall

There are two tiers of local government, at parish (town) and unitary authority level: Buckingham Town Council and Buckinghamshire Council. The town council is based at the Buckingham Centre on Verney Close in the town.

Historically, Buckingham was an ancient borough, and it became a municipal borough in 1836. Buckingham Borough Council was based at Buckingham Town Hall until 1965, when it moved to Castle House on West Street. The borough was abolished in 1974 to become part of Aylesbury Vale district, with Buckingham Town Council being established as a successor parish covering the former borough. Aylesbury Vale District Council in turn was abolished in 2020, merging with Buckinghamshire County Council and the county's other districts to become Buckinghamshire Council.

== Tourism ==
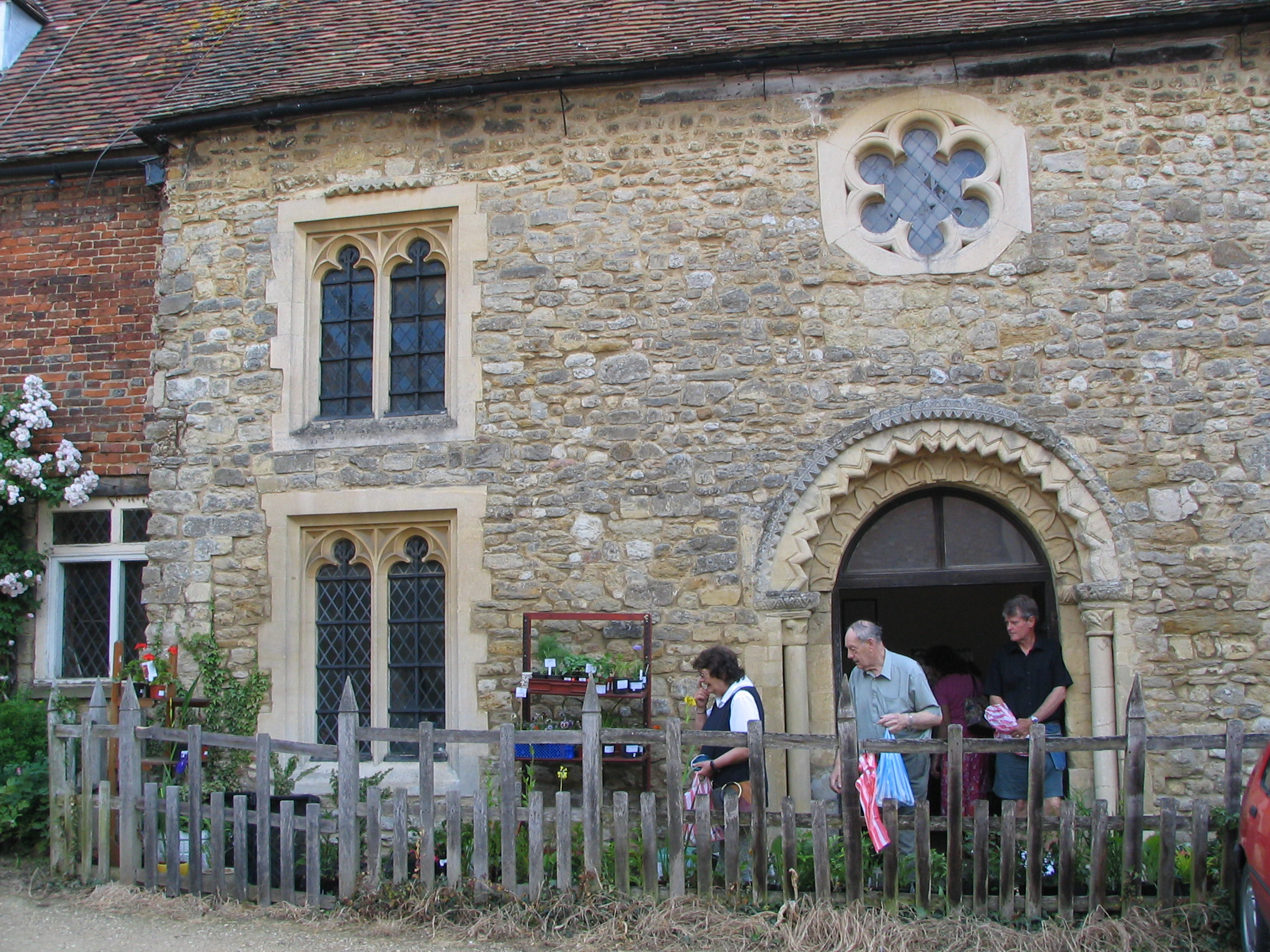
Chantry Chapel, owned by the National Trust and previously by the Royal Latin School

The town's tourist attractions include the Chantry Chapel, the Buckingham Old Gaol museum, the Sir George Gilbert Scott-designed St Peter & St Paul Church, and a number of picturesque Georgian streetscapes. Stowe School, Stowe Landscape Gardens and Silverstone Circuit are nearby.

Buckingham has a number of hotels, including the Villiers Hotel and White Hart in the town centre, with the Best Western Buckingham Hotel and Travelodge on the outskirts.

== Healthcare ==
Buckingham is served by one GP surgery (the Swan Practice) and a community hospital. A minor injuries unit at the hospital was closed in 2009 and the nearest major hospital with an accident & emergency department is in Milton Keynes.

== Transport ==
=== Roads ===
Buckingham stands at the crossroads of the A413 (north-south), A421 and A422 (east-west) roads. The town was by-passed in the early 1980s, with a new section of the A421 to the south.

=== Buses ===
Bus services are operated by Stagecoach East, Arriva Herts & Essex, Red Rose Travel, Marshall's Coaches and Langston & Tasker. Key routes include:

- X5: Bedford - Milton Keynes - Oxford
- X6: Milton Keynes - Winslow - Aylesbury.

Some surrounding villages are connected to Buckingham by a market day bus and there is a community bus scheme called Bart.

=== Canal ===
Buckingham was served by the Buckingham Arm of the Grand Junction Canal from 1801 until the end of the 19th century. In 1928, the Grand Junction Canal Company offered to reopen the canal if a minimum income of tolls could be guaranteed, but this was not forthcoming, with only occasional use reported up to 1932 and the canal was finally abandoned in 1964. The canal ran from Cosgrove, Northamptonshire, to the centre of Buckingham to a wharf. A short section of the canal to the east of the town has now been restored.

=== Railway ===
Buckingham railway station served the town on the Banbury to Verney Junction Branch Line; it was opened in 1850, closing to passengers in 1964 and freight in 1966. Finmere railway station, on the Great Central Main Line, was originally called Finmere for Buckingham when it opened in 1899, despite being 5 miles (8 km) from Buckingham; the "for Buckingham" suffix was dropped from its name in the early 1920s and it was closed in 1963.

The closest stations to Buckingham are now:

- Wolverton and Milton Keynes Central to the east, on the West Coast Main Line
- Bicester North to the south-west, on the Chiltern Main Line
- Bicester Village, on the Oxford–Bicester line.

The new East West rail link will have a stop at nearby Winslow.

== Places of worship ==
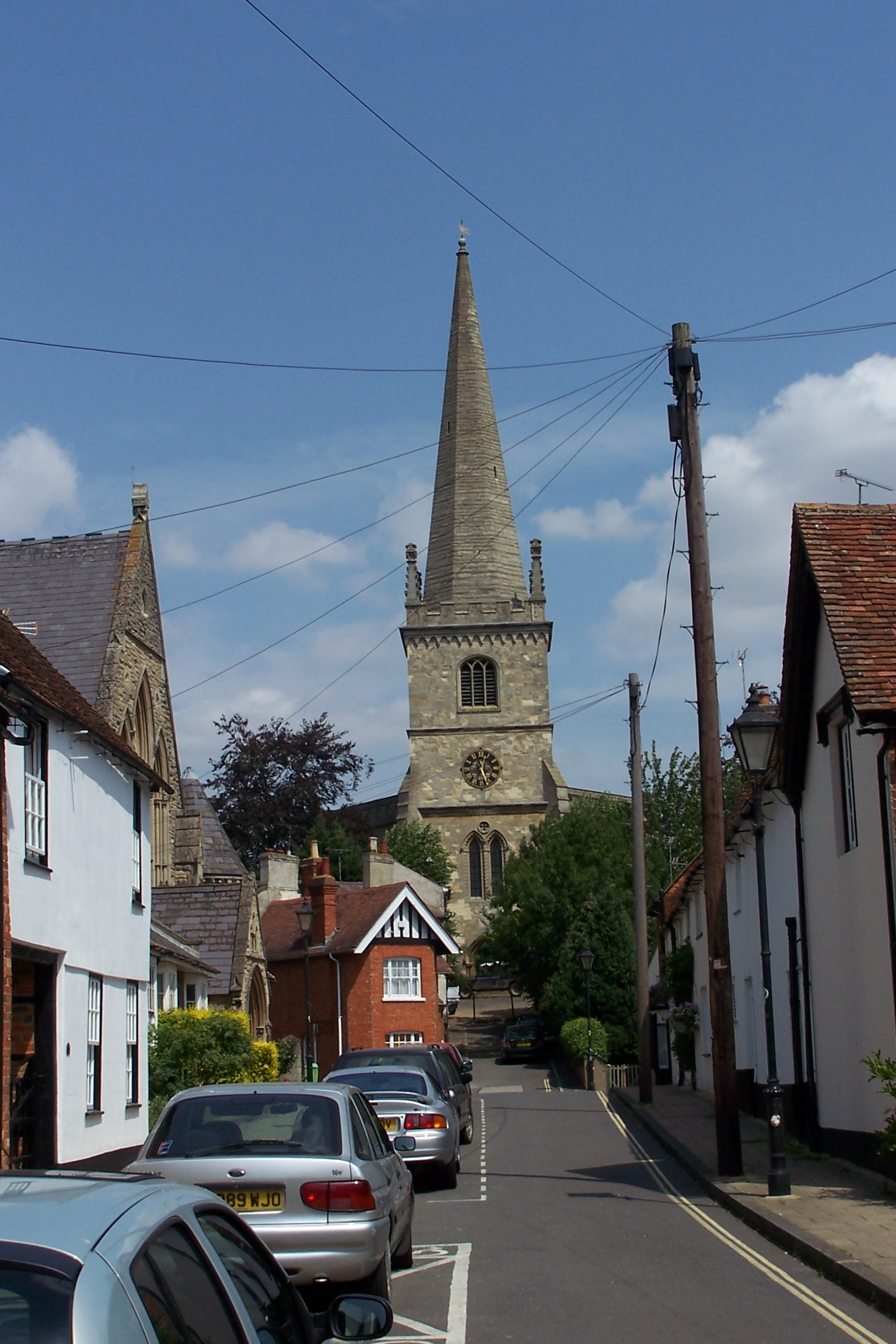
St Peter and St Paul, viewed from the south-west

- St Bernardine's Catholic Church
- Buckingham Evangelical Church
- St Peter and St Paul (Church of England)
- Salvation Army
- Well Street United Church (Methodist, Baptist and United Reformed Church).

== Culture ==
Buckingham Old Gaol is the town's museum which was established in 1993 in the historic town centre Old Gaol building. It also houses temporary exhibitions and the Tourist Information Centre.

The Chandos Cinema was in operation from 1934 and closed in 1987 but, in 2005, an independent community cinema opened in the university called the Film Place. Live music events are regularly held in the Radcliffe Centre.

A library is located in the town centre, operated by Buckinghamshire County Council. The town is home to numerous clubs and associations, including the Buckingham Society, a civic amenity society linked with Civic Voice, a large University of the Third Age (U3A) with over 900 members, and many music, photography and arts clubs.

The town holds an annual charter fair. It is held in October over two successive Saturdays starting on the first Saturday after the 11th of the month. During the 19th century it was called the Statute Fair. The public roasting of an ox, sheep and pig often took place at the same time.

== Media ==
The town is served by the Buckingham & Winslow Advertiser weekly newspaper.

Local radio stations are BBC Three Counties Radio, Heart East, Greatest Hits Radio Bucks, Beds and Herts and 3Bs Radio, a community-based station that broadcast to the town as well as to Bicester and Brackley.

The town lies between two television transmitters, with residents able to choose between Oxford (BBC South / ITV Meridian) and Sandy Heath (BBC East / ITV Anglia).

== Sport ==
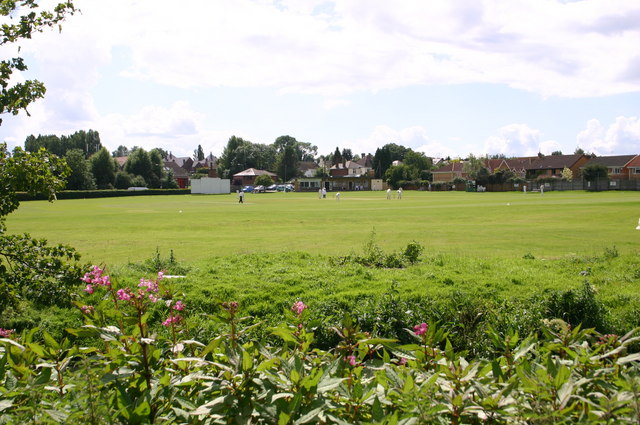
Buckingham Town Cricket Club's ground

There are two local football teams and a rugby union club, including teams for women and young women; these are: Buckingham F.C., based at Stratford Fields; and Buckingham RUFC, based at Floyd Field, Maids Moreton.

The town also has the Buckingham Town Cricket Club, based at Bourton Road, and the Buckingham Hockey Club, which plays at Stowe School. Since 2014, the town has been host to a weekly 5 km (3.1 mi) Parkrun.

The town has several public sports facilities, including the Swan Leisure Centre with an indoor swimming pool, climbing wall, an all weather sports pitch and squash courts. There are two bowls pitches, tennis courts and several private golf clubs in the vicinity of the town.

== Notable people ==
- George Baldock, footballer, who attended the Royal Latin School
- Sam Baldock, footballer, who also attended the Royal Latin School
- Bill Benyon, MP for Buckingham 1970-83
- John Bercow, MP for Buckingham 1997–2019 and speaker of the House of Commons 2009-19
- Gillian Blake, actress
- Wyndham Hazelton, cricketer
- Dan Jones, writer, attended the Royal Latin School
- Frank Markham, MP for Buckingham 1951–64
- Bernie Marsden, guitarist/songwriter with rock band Whitesnake, was born in Buckingham
- Robert Maxwell, businessman and MP for Buckingham 1964–1970
- Shan Morgan, a civil servant who attended the Royal Latin School
- Prince Philippe, Count of Paris, an exiled claimant to the French throne, leased Stowe
- Craig Pickering, athlete, attended the Royal Latin School
- David Pickering, writer and compiler of reference books
- Mary Pix (1666–1709), novelist and playwright
- George Gilbert Scott, architect
- Anthony Seldon, vice-chancellor of the University of Buckingham
- Richard Temple-Nugent-Brydges-Chandos-Grenville, 2nd Duke of Buckingham and Chandos, born at Stowe
- Browne Willis, MP for Buckingham 1705–1708.

== Twin towns ==
Buckingham has been twinned with Joinville, in France, since 1963.

In 2002, Buckingham became twinned with the French town of Mouvaux.

In 2020, Buckingham formalised its links with the German town of Neukirchen-Vluyn, Mouvaux's twin town in Germany, and the three towns (Buckingham, Mouvaux and Neukirch-Vluyn) became officially twinned.

In June 2025, Buckingham became twinned with Valmadrera in Italy.

== See also ==
- Buckingham (UK Parliament constituency) (1542 to 2024).
- Buckingham Palace, originally built for the Duke of Buckingham in the City of Westminster, Greater London, is named after the town.
- The town gave its name to Buckingham Township, Bucks County, Pennsylvania, United States
- Duke of Buckingham
- Duchess of Buckingham
