= Rickett (car) =

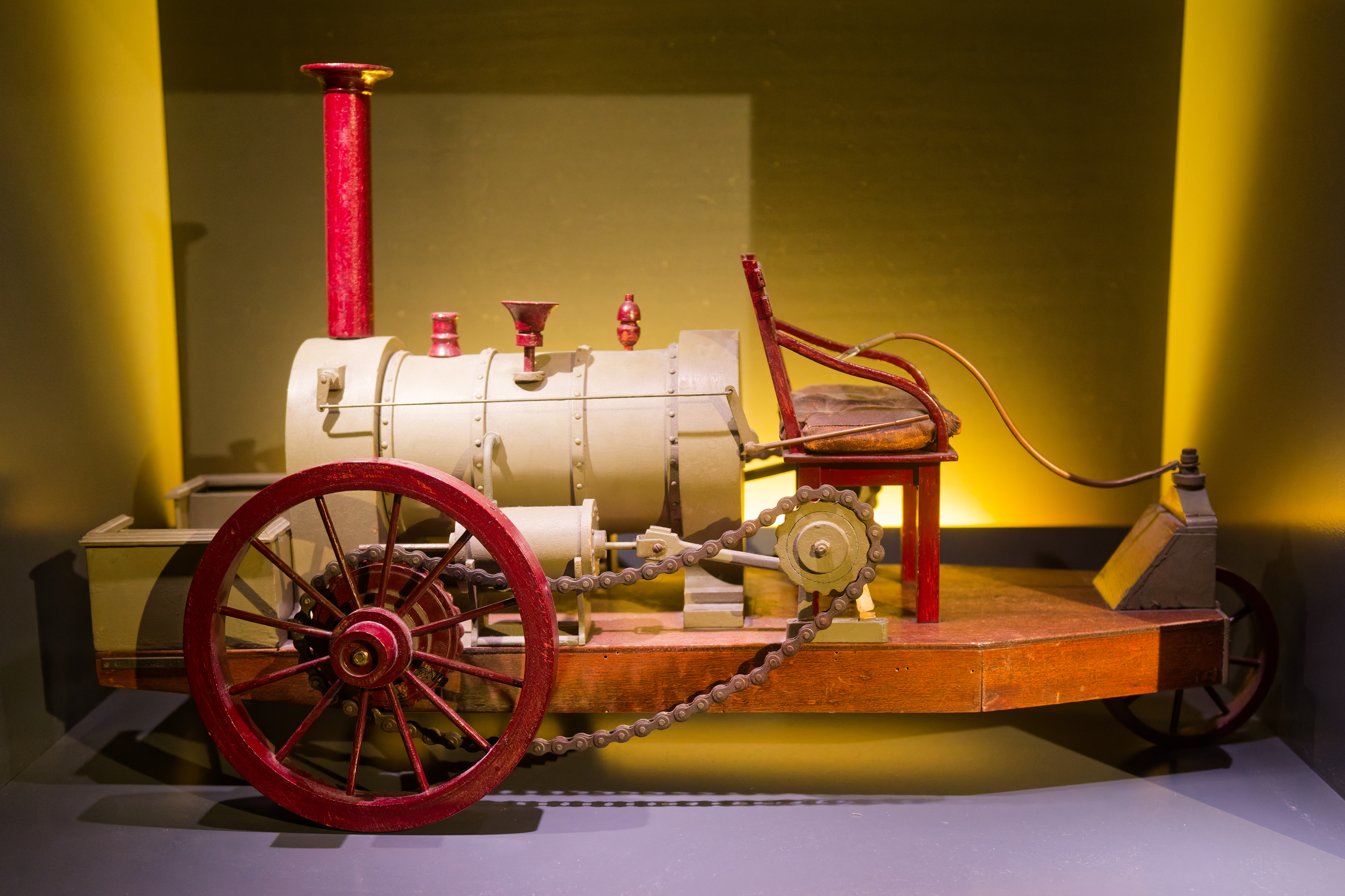
Model of the Rickett car at the Museo Nazionale dell'Automobile in Turin, Italy.

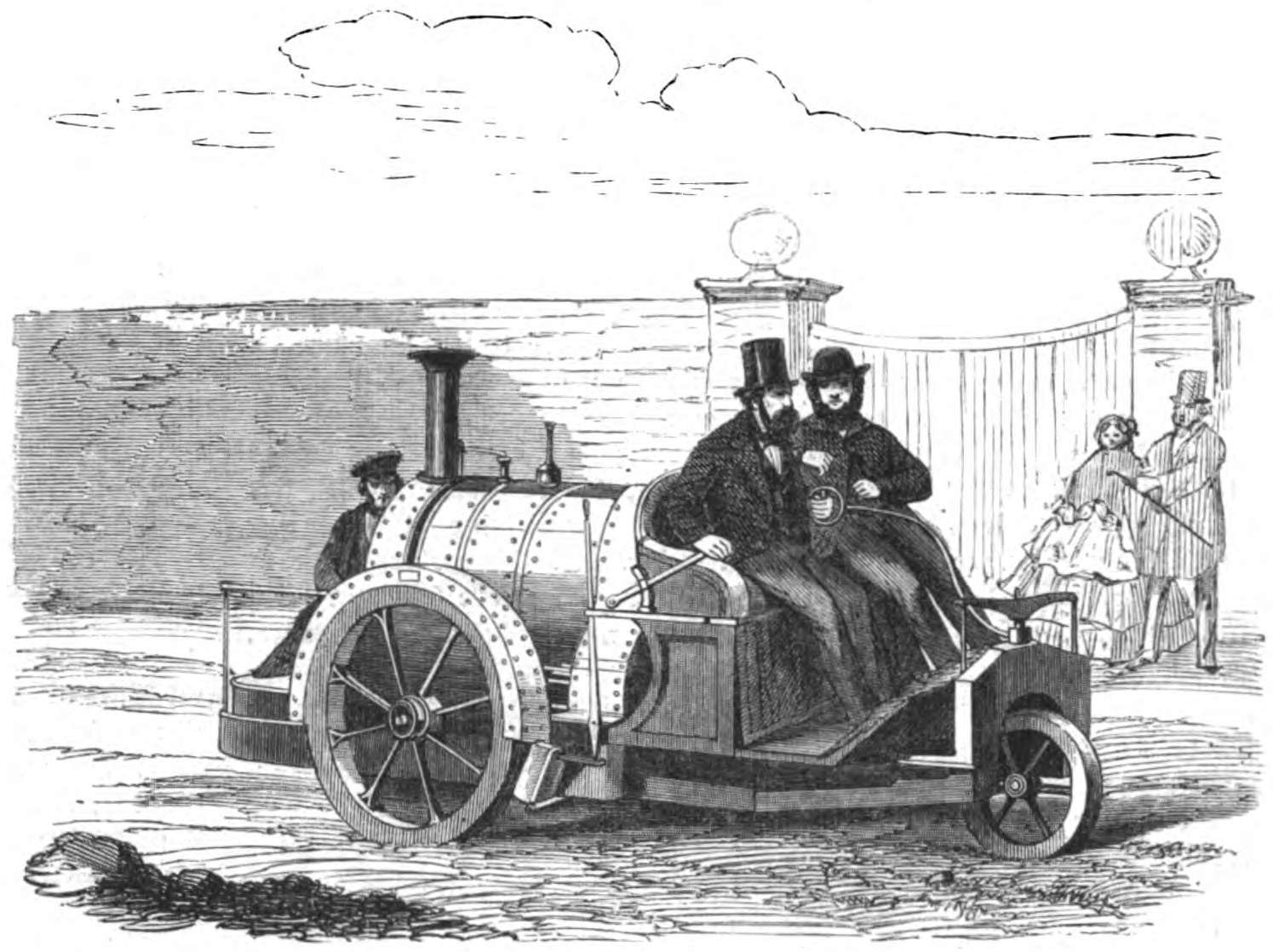
The 26 February 1860 issue of Illustreret Tidende featured an article about the steam car produced by Thomas Rickett of Buckingham.

Thomas Rickett from Buckingham, England, made a steam-powered car in 1860. Several examples were made, and it was also advertised.

== Steam plough ==
Rickett was manager of the Castle Foundry in Buckingham, makers of agricultural implements, who in 1857 also started to make steam engines. In 1858 he combined the two to make a steam plough. The plough cost £500 (about £53,700 today) and was manned by three men.

== Steam carriage ==
The steam plough inspired the Marquess of Stafford to order a steam carriage – probably in 1859. This vehicle had three wheels, the single wheel at the front, and a rear-mounted coal-fired boiler and two-cylinder engine. The boiler pressure was 110 psi, and the cylinders had a bore of 76 mm and stroke of 178 mm. Transmission was by chain to the right-hand rear wheel. A maximum speed of 19 mph was claimed. A boilerman was seated at the rear, and three passengers could sit side by side at the front with the one on the right operating a tiller steering and the regulator, reversing lever and brake. The wheels had iron "tyres", with the brakes operating on the rear wheels.

A second example was ordered by the Earl of Caithness, but this time the wheels were driven through a two-speed gearbox and spur gears. It was demonstrated to the royal family at Windsor Castle in January 1860. The Earl used the car to drive 146 miles from Inverness to Barrogill Castle, 20 miles north of Wick in Scotland, accompanied by his wife, with Thomas Rickett acting as engine man.

Encouraged by his success, Rickett placed an advertisement in The Engineer magazine advertising his carriages for sale at £180 to £200. He was, however, ahead of his time, and it is not thought that any more were sold.

== Steam Coach ==
In 1861 Rickett's demonstrated a steam coach by taking it from Buckingham to Wolverton. He said that the coach was intended for use on roads in Switzerland.

== Road Train ==
Rickett's next venture was a 12-ton road steam engine, which was designed to pull wagons along the road. This was built for and demonstrated to some Spanish gentlemen by driving it pulling three loaded wagons weighing 28 tons from Buckingham to Mixbury and back – about 6 miles. Another of the road trains was sold to Copenhagen in Denmark after it had been inspected by a Danish engineer, Mr Hjorth.

== Financial problems ==
By 1865 the Foundry was in financial trouble. It was put up for letting in February that year. A possible reason was the passing of increasingly restrictive legislation, the Locomotive Acts, in 1861 and 1865 which made the use of steam propelled vehicles on roads impractical.

== See also ==
- List of car manufacturers of the United Kingdom
- Link to Photograph of Rickett's steam carriage c.1860
