= 2011 Aylesbury Vale District Council election =

2011 UK local government election

Map of the results of the 2011 Aylesbury Vale council election. Conservatives in blue, Liberal Democrats in yellow, UK Independence Party in purple, Labour in red and Independents in grey.

The 2011 Aylesbury Vale District Council election took place on 5 May 2011 to elect members of Aylesbury Vale District Council in Buckinghamshire, England. The whole council was up for election and the Conservative Party stayed in overall control of the council.

== Election result ==
The results saw the Conservatives retain control of the council after winning 37 of the 59 seats. Conservative cabinet member Huw Lewis lost in Buckingham North, but the party gained a seat in Aylesbury Central by 1 vote over Liberal Democrat mayor Graham Webster. The Liberal Democrats lost seats, dropping to 17 councillors, with the Liberal Democrat group leader Alan Sherwell being defeated in Bedgrove.

Both the UK Independence Party and the Labour Party won 2 seats, while independent Peter Cooper retained his seat in Wingrave. For the UK Independence Party the 2 seats they won in Quarrendon were the first seats the party had ever won on the council, while Labour returned to the council for the first time in over 10 years after winning seats in Buckingham South and Southcourt.

Aylesbury Vale local election result 2011
Party	Seats	Gains	Losses	Net gain/loss	Seats %	Votes %	Votes	+/−
Conservative	37	4	4	0	62.7	49.0	52,956	-3.5
Liberal Democrats	17	3	7	-4	28.8	25.3	27,351	-9.8
UKIP	2	2	0	+2	3.4	14.7	15,891	+9.6
Labour	2	2	0	+2	3.4	7.3	7,886	+2.3
Independent	1	0	0	0	1.7	3.1	3,396	+0.8
Green	0	0	0	0	0.0	0.4	459	+0.4
TUSC	0	0	0	0	0.0	0.2	183	+0.2

== Ward results ==
Aston Clinton (3)
Party	Candidate	Votes	%	±%
Conservative	Carole Paternoster	2,375		
Conservative	Phil Yerby	2,223		
Conservative	David Thompson	1,990		
Independent	Nigel Hayward	843		
Liberal Democrats	Jeremy Hodge	796		
Liberal Democrats	Claire Houston	524		
UKIP	John Day	446		
UKIP	Pauline Day	432		
Liberal Democrats	Neil Stuart	425		
UKIP	William Hamilton	401		
Turnout		10,455	51.0	+9
Conservative hold		Swing		
Conservative hold		Swing		
Conservative hold		Swing		

Aylesbury Central
Party	Candidate	Votes	%	±%
Conservative	Barbara Russel	307	31.8	−4.5
Liberal Democrats	Graham Webster	306	31.7	−20.8
Labour	Michael Padmore	253	26.2	+26.2
UKIP	Stephen Barrow	99	10.3	−0.9
Majority		1	0.1	N/A
Turnout		965	34.7	−1
Conservative gain from Liberal Democrats		Swing		

Bedgrove (3)
Party	Candidate	Votes	%	±%
Conservative	Jenny Bloom	1,624		
Conservative	Tom Hunter-Watts	1,359		
Conservative	Mark Winn	1,353		
Liberal Democrats	Penni Thorne	1,297		
Liberal Democrats	Alan Sherwell	1,157		
Liberal Democrats	Mark Willis	1,105		
Labour	Ruth McGoldrick	408		
UKIP	Charly Smith	408		
UKIP	Jamie Boyce	398		
UKIP	Daniel Lewis	378		
Labour	Martin Abel	365		
Turnout		9,852	51.7	+4
Conservative hold		Swing		
Conservative gain from Liberal Democrats		Swing		
Conservative gain from Liberal Democrats		Swing		

Bierton
Party	Candidate	Votes	%	±%
Liberal Democrats	Julie Ward	461	57.6	+2.9
Conservative	Bill Chapple	206	25.7	−13.1
Labour	Steve Perry	75	9.4	+9.4
UKIP	Nicola Adams	59	7.4	+0.9
Majority		255	31.8	+15.9
Turnout		801	57.0	+5
Liberal Democrats hold		Swing		

Brill
Party	Candidate	Votes	%	±%
Conservative	Michael Rand	693	59.4	−3.2
Labour	Joanna Dodsworth	230	19.7	−0.3
Liberal Democrats	Bette Melling	173	14.8	−2.6
UKIP	Deborah Sharman	70	6.0	+6.0
Majority		463	39.7	−2.9
Turnout		1,166	56.8	+10
Conservative hold		Swing		

Buckingham North (2)
Party	Candidate	Votes	%	±%
Conservative	Derrick Isham	855		
Conservative	Tim Mills	788		
Labour	Rob Lehmann	609		
Labour	Mike Smith	499		
Independent	Andy Mahi	351		
UKIP	John Russell	177		
UKIP	Mark Hazle	119		
Turnout		3,398	36.9	+8
Conservative hold		Swing		
Conservative hold		Swing		

Buckingham South (2)
Party	Candidate	Votes	%	±%
Conservative	Howard Mordue	875		
Labour	Robin Stuchbury	843		
Conservative	Huw Lewis	778		
Labour	Jon Harvey	446		
UKIP	Paul Hazle	98		
UKIP	Nicola Paine	95		
Turnout		3,135	40.9	+7
Conservative hold		Swing		
Labour gain from Conservative		Swing		

Cheddington
Party	Candidate	Votes	%	±%
Liberal Democrats	Corry Cashman	800	59.5	+10.9
Conservative	Lawrence Renshell	436	32.4	−10.6
UKIP	Nicholas Griffin	108	8.0	−0.5
Majority		364	27.1	+21.5
Turnout		1,344	56.0	+5
Liberal Democrats hold		Swing		

Coldharbour (3)
Party	Candidate	Votes	%	±%
Liberal Democrats	Steven Lambert	1,239		
Liberal Democrats	Paul Hughes	1,059		
Liberal Democrats	Mike Smith	1,043		
Conservative	Andrew Cole	977		
Conservative	Sam Davidson	739		
Conservative	Talib Hussain	679		
UKIP	Bruce Bolton	373		
UKIP	Gavin Richardson	371		
UKIP	Stefanie Falle	314		
Turnout		6,794	38.8	+5
Liberal Democrats hold		Swing		
Liberal Democrats hold		Swing		
Liberal Democrats gain from Conservative		Swing		

Edlesborough
Party	Candidate	Votes	%	±%
Conservative	Chris Poll	560	46.2	−13.7
Independent	Kevin Cubbage	489	40.3	+40.3
Labour	Bob Kempster	102	8.4	+8.4
UKIP	Emma Griffin	62	5.1	−10.1
Majority		71	5.9	−29.4
Turnout		1,213	52.7	+3
Conservative hold		Swing		

Elmhurst & Watermead (3)
Party	Candidate	Votes	%	±%
Liberal Democrats	Raj Khan	945		
Liberal Democrats	Lisa Smith	880		
Conservative	Alan Ward	794		
Conservative	Gillian Neale-Sheppard	714		
Liberal Democrats	Ansar Mahmood	707		
Conservative	Mike Arrowsmith	690		
UKIP	Brian Adams	474		
UKIP	Ann Day	443		
Labour	Michael Rowlinson	418		
UKIP	Pat Norris	406		
Turnout		6,471	38.0	+3
Liberal Democrats hold		Swing		
Liberal Democrats hold		Swing		
Conservative gain from Liberal Democrats		Swing		

Gatehouse (2)
Party	Candidate	Votes	%	±%
Liberal Democrats	Tuffail Hussain	622		
Liberal Democrats	Stuart Jarvis	580		
Conservative	Paul Milham	342		
Conservative	Dvora Kader	288		
Labour	Shirley Raw	279		
UKIP	Barbara Adams	256		
UKIP	Alex Furness	233		
Turnout		2,600	33.0	+4
Liberal Democrats hold		Swing		
Liberal Democrats hold		Swing		

Great Brickhill
Party	Candidate	Votes	%	±%
Conservative	Neil Blake	856	71.7	+3.5
Liberal Democrats	Clive Parish	196	16.4	−8.6
UKIP	Amber Pinnock	142	11.9	+5.1
Majority		660	55.3	+12.1
Turnout		1,194	48.7	+8
Conservative hold		Swing		

Great Horwood
Party	Candidate	Votes	%	±%
Conservative	Beville Stanier	818	65.0	−22.1
Labour	Christine Strain-Clark	162	12.9	+12.9
Liberal Democrats	David Barry	146	11.6	+11.6
UKIP	Sasha Bates	133	10.6	−2.3
Majority		656	52.1	−22.1
Turnout		1,259	52.5	+12
Conservative hold		Swing		

Grendon Underwood
Party	Candidate	Votes	%	±%
Conservative	John Cartwright	575	55.1	−20.8
UKIP	Paul Irwin	314	30.1	+30.1
Liberal Democrats	Patrick Mahon	155	14.8	−9.3
Majority		261	25.0	−26.8
Turnout		1,044	51.2	+8
Conservative hold		Swing		

Haddenham (3)
Party	Candidate	Votes	%	±%
Conservative	Judy Brandis	2,393		
Conservative	Brian Foster	2,145		
Conservative	Andrew Douglas-Bate	1,912		
Liberal Democrats	Bob Hammond	1,058		
UKIP	Lisa Natale	429		
UKIP	Amethyst Sharman	332		
UKIP	Brett Steptowe	317		
Turnout		8,586	51.7	+4
Conservative hold		Swing		
Conservative hold		Swing		
Conservative hold		Swing		

Long Crendon (2)
Party	Candidate	Votes	%	±%
Conservative	Michael Edmonds	1,185		
Conservative	Mike Hawkett	1,043		
Independent	Ann Hooton	625		
Liberal Democrats	Lesley Dunbar	369		
Labour	Elizabeth Liggett	358		
UKIP	Colin Evered	156		
UKIP	Jonathan Evered	132		
Turnout		3,510	53.4	+5
Conservative hold		Swing		
Conservative hold		Swing		

Luffield Abbey
Party	Candidate	Votes	%	±%
Conservative	Pearl Lewis	639	63.5	−16.9
Labour	Tony Chan	127	12.6	−7.0
Green	Nicola Smith	102	10.1	+10.1
UKIP	Stephen Boyce	81	8.1	+8.1
Liberal Democrats	Paul Burns	57	5.7	+5.7
Majority		512	50.9	−9.9
Turnout		1,006	49.0	+8
Conservative hold		Swing		

Mandeville & Elm Farm (3)
Party	Candidate	Votes	%	±%
Conservative	Sue Chapple	1,473		
Conservative	Brian Roberts	1,411		
Conservative	Brian Tyndall	1,203		
Liberal Democrats	Richard Lloyd	532		
Liberal Democrats	Laurence Hughes	490		
Liberal Democrats	Peter Vernon	476		
UKIP	Heather Adams	457		
UKIP	Gerard McCormack	360		
Green	Nigel Foster	357		
UKIP	Aimee Gibson	354		
Turnout		7,113	41.5	+2
Conservative hold		Swing		
Conservative hold		Swing		
Conservative hold		Swing		

Marsh Gibbon
Party	Candidate	Votes	%	±%
Conservative	Jackie Phipps	817	61.6	+0.4
Liberal Democrats	Ian Metherell	349	26.3	−12.5
UKIP	Sam Clinton	160	12.1	+12.1
Majority		468	35.3	+12.9
Turnout		1,326	52.0	+3
Conservative hold		Swing		

Newton Longville
Party	Candidate	Votes	%	±%
Conservative	Pam Pearce	785	75.6	+12.1
Liberal Democrats	Jonathan Ginn	130	12.5	−24.0
UKIP	Roy Black	123	11.8	+11.8
Majority		655	63.1	+36.1
Turnout		1,038	52.2	−1
Conservative hold		Swing		

Oakfield (2)
Party	Candidate	Votes	%	±%
Liberal Democrats	Steve Patrick	475		
Liberal Democrats	Glenda Reynolds	437		
Conservative	Denise Summers	431		
Conservative	Tim Weston	419		
Labour	Roy McNickle	336		
Independent	Patrick Martin	288		
Labour	Phil McGoldrick	246		
UKIP	Robyn Adams	205		
UKIP	Nikita Filbey	164		
Turnout		3,001	39.6	+7
Liberal Democrats hold		Swing		
Liberal Democrats hold		Swing		

Pitstone
Party	Candidate	Votes	%	±%
Liberal Democrats	Avril Davies	805	64.3	−5.3
Conservative	Angela Macpherson	335	26.8	−3.6
UKIP	Paula Boyce	111	8.9	+8.9
Majority		470	37.6	−1.6
Turnout		1,251	46.0	+3
Liberal Democrats hold		Swing		

Quainton
Party	Candidate	Votes	%	±%
Conservative	Sue Polhill	637	52.2	−17.2
UKIP	Jim Styles	397	32.5	+32.5
Liberal Democrats	Patrina Law	187	15.3	+0.4
Majority		240	19.7	−34.0
Turnout		1,221	61.1	+13
Conservative hold		Swing		

Quarrendon (2)
Party	Candidate	Votes	%	±%
UKIP	Chris Adams	399		
UKIP	Andy Huxley	362		
Liberal Democrats	Ray Ghent	335		
Liberal Democrats	Maria Butler	286		
Conservative	Noreen O'Sullivan	282		
Labour	David Caldwell	210		
Conservative	Wajid Kiani	208		
Labour	Zard Khan	166		
Turnout		2,248	32.2	−7
UKIP gain from Liberal Democrats		Swing		
UKIP gain from Liberal Democrats		Swing		

Southcourt (2)
Party	Candidate	Votes	%	±%
Liberal Democrats	Freda Roberts	539		
Labour	Michael Beall	442		
Liberal Democrats	David Ralph	412		
Labour	Andrew Cowburn	399		
Conservative	Anis Gabbur	307		
Conservative	Henry Hall	234		
UKIP	Sheila Hamilton	211		
UKIP	Petra Johns	180		
Turnout		2,724	32.0	+0
Liberal Democrats hold		Swing		
Labour gain from Liberal Democrats		Swing		

Steeple Claydon
Party	Candidate	Votes	%	±%
Conservative	John Chilver	533	55.9	+9.6
UKIP	Guy Lachlan	154	16.1	+16.1
Labour	David Seabrook	148	15.5	+8.3
Liberal Democrats	Gareth Davies	119	12.5	+12.5
Majority		379	39.7	+21.8
Turnout		954	42.8	+6
Conservative hold		Swing		

Stewkley
Party	Candidate	Votes	%	±%
Conservative	Janet Blake	795	63.2	
Liberal Democrats	Lucy Monger	340	27.0	
UKIP	Josh Richardson	123	9.8	
Majority		455	36.2	
Turnout		1,258	53.6	
Conservative hold		Swing		

Tingewick
Party	Candidate	Votes	%	±%
Conservative	Patrick Fealey	885	69.4	+0.5
Labour	Jack Stuchbury	269	21.1	+0.8
UKIP	Sheila Sewell	121	9.5	+9.5
Majority		616	48.3	−0.3
Turnout		1,275	49.0	+2
Conservative hold		Swing		

Waddesdon
Party	Candidate	Votes	%	±%
Liberal Democrats	David Vick	413	37.5	+26.6
UKIP	Dave Fowler	328	29.8	−10.8
Conservative	David Wilkes	274	24.9	−23.7
Labour	Sue Roberts	86	7.8	+7.8
Majority		85	7.7	
Turnout		1,101	56.2	+7
Liberal Democrats gain from Conservative		Swing		

Walton Court & Hawkslade (2)
Party	Candidate	Votes	%	±%
Liberal Democrats	Steven Kennell	572		
Liberal Democrats	Ranjula Takodra	534		
Conservative	Sarah Sproat	374		
Conservative	Mark Wilkins	306		
UKIP	Jessica Black	298		
UKIP	John Wiseman	261		
TUSC	Roger Priest	183		
Turnout		2,528	33.0	+2
Liberal Democrats hold		Swing		
Liberal Democrats hold		Swing		

Weedon
Party	Candidate	Votes	%	±%
Conservative	Ashley Bond	522	53.2	−17.4
Liberal Democrats	Mary Baldwin	174	17.7	+6.9
Labour	Maggie Ewan	159	16.2	+4.4
UKIP	Tony Ward	127	12.9	+6.0
Majority		348	35.4	−23.4
Turnout		982	45.0	−5
Conservative hold		Swing		

Wendover (3)
Party	Candidate	Votes	%	±%
Conservative	Chris Richards	1,679		
Conservative	Peter Strachan	1,574		
Conservative	Steve Bowles	1,521		
UKIP	Derek Coles	744		
UKIP	John Lesingham	716		
UKIP	Clinton Ruddock	641		
Liberal Democrats	Katie Willis	609		
Liberal Democrats	Christine Smith	553		
Liberal Democrats	Simon Weaver	493		
Turnout		8,530	49.3	+7
Conservative hold		Swing		
Conservative hold		Swing		
Conservative hold		Swing		

Wing
Party	Candidate	Votes	%	±%
Conservative	Netta Glover	700	67.2	−4.7
Liberal Democrats	Mark Watson	236	22.6	+3.9
UKIP	Martin Norris	106	10.2	+0.8
Majority		464	44.5	−8.7
Turnout		1,042	48.2	+9
Conservative hold		Swing		

Wingrave
Party	Candidate	Votes	%	±%
Independent	Peter Cooper	800	70.2	+12.3
Conservative	Kevin Hewson	290	25.4	−5.1
UKIP	Natasha Mitchell	50	4.4	+4.4
Majority		510	44.7	+17.3
Turnout		1,140	54.6	+10
Independent hold		Swing		

Winslow (2)
Party	Candidate	Votes	%	±%
Liberal Democrats	Llew Monger	982		
Conservative	Susan Renshell	918		
Conservative	Duncan Wigley	832		
Liberal Democrats	Trish Cawte	773		
Labour	Peter Strain-Clark	251		
UKIP	Jonathan Bates	245		
UKIP	Phil Gomm	238		
Turnout		4,239	49.4	+6
Liberal Democrats gain from Conservative		Swing		
Conservative hold		Swing		

== By-elections between 2011 and 2015 ==
=== Oakfield ===
A by-election was held in Oakfield on 3 October 2013 after the death of Liberal Democrat councillor Steve Patrick. The seat was held for the Liberal Democrats by Alison Harrison with a majority of 81 votes over UK Independence Party candidate Philip Gomm.

Oakfield by-election 3 October 2013
Party	Candidate	Votes	%	±%
Liberal Democrats	Alison Harrison	406	34.8	+7.4
UKIP	Philip Gomm	325	27.8	+16.0
Conservative	Edward Sims	173	14.8	−10.0
Labour	Robert McNickle	145	12.4	−6.9
Independent	Patrick Martin	118	10.1	−6.5
Majority		81	7.0	
Turnout		1,167	28.7	−10.9
Liberal Democrats hold		Swing		

=== Gatehouse ===
A by-election was held in Gatehouse on 11 December 2014 after the resignation of Liberal Democrat councillor Stuart Jarvis. The seat was held for the Liberal Democrats by Anders Christensen with a majority of 28 votes over UK Independence Party candidate Graham Cadle.

Gatehouse by-election 11 December 2014
Party	Candidate	Votes	%	±%
Liberal Democrats	Anders Christensen	295	35.6	−5.9
UKIP	Graham Cadle	267	32.2	+15.2
Conservative	Samantha North	113	13.6	−9.2
Labour	Lucio Tangi	113	13.6	−5.0
Green	Mary Hunt	28	3.4	+3.4
Independent	George Entecott	12	1.4	+1.4
Majority		28	3.4	
Turnout		828	17.7	−15.3
Liberal Democrats hold		Swing		

=== Southcourt ===
A by-election was held in Southcourt on 11 December 2014 after the resignation of Labour councillor Michael Beall. The seat was gained for the Liberal Democrats by Peter Agoro with a majority of 163 votes over UK Independence Party candidate Brian Adams.

Southcourt by-election 11 December 2014
Party	Candidate	Votes	%	±%
Liberal Democrats	Peter Agoro	429	42.3	+6.3
UKIP	Brian Adams	266	26.2	+12.1
Labour	Mark Bateman	175	17.2	−12.2
Conservative	Sarah Sproat	112	11.0	−9.4
Green	Jedrze Kulig	33	3.3	+3.3
Majority		163	16.1	N/A
Turnout		1,015	21.0	−11.0
Liberal Democrats gain from Labour		Swing		
