= 2015 Aylesbury Vale District Council election =

2015 UK local government election

Map of the results of the 2015 Aylesbury Vale council election. Conservatives in blue, Liberal Democrats in yellow, UK Independence Party in purple, Labour in red and Independents in grey.

The 2015 Aylesbury Vale District Council election took place on 7 May 2015 to elect members of Aylesbury Vale District Council in Buckinghamshire, England. The whole council was up for election with boundary changes since the last election in 2011. The Conservative Party remained in overall control of the council.

== Election result ==
Overall turnout at the election was 68%.

Aylesbury Vale local election result 2015
Party	Seats	Gains	Losses	Net gain/loss	Seats %	Votes %	Votes	+/−
Conservative	43			+7	72.9	44.0	76,413	-5.0%
Liberal Democrats	9			-8	15.3	15.5	26,920	-9.8%
UKIP	4			+1	6.8	21.8	37,886	+7.1%
Labour	2			+1	3.4	7.2	12,454	-0.1%
Independent	1			-1	1.7	2.1	3,724	-1.0%
Green	0			0	0	9.4	16,282	+9.0%

== Ward results ==
Aston Clinton and Stoke Mandeville (3 seats)
Party	Candidate	Votes	%	±%
Conservative	Michael Collins	2,701		
Conservative	William Chapple	2,664		
Conservative	Carole Paternoster	2,591		
UKIP	Philip Yerby	1,853		
UKIP	Geoffrey Baile	1,532		
UKIP	Lesley Baile	1,429		
Labour	Martin Abel	770		
Liberal Democrats	Neil Stuart	766		
Green	Huseyin Caglayan	710		
Green	Cameron Kaye	604		
Turnout		15,620	76	

Bedgrove (2 seats)
Party	Candidate	Votes	%	±%
Conservative	Tom Hunter-Watts	1,638		
Conservative	Mark Winn	1,568		
UKIP	Angelicka Bignell	746		
UKIP	Daneil Lewis	662		
Liberal Democrats	Glenda Reynolds	598		
Independent	Philip Gomm	579		
Labour	Lyn Griffiths	546		
Green	Matthew Edwards	288		
Green	Alexander Attridge	199		
Turnout		6,824	77	

Buckingham North (2 seats)
Party	Candidate	Votes	%	±%
Conservative	Simon Cole	1,358		
Conservative	Timothy Mills	1,259		
Labour	Ruth Newell	803		
UKIP	Nicholas Shipp	595		
Labour	Christine Strain-Clark	590		
Green	Dinah Barton	413		
Turnout		5,018	60	

Buckingham South (2 seats)
Party	Candidate	Votes	%	±%
Labour	Robin Stuchbury	1,478		
Conservative	Howard Mordue	1,307		
Conservative	Florence Hunter	962		
Labour	Jon Harvey	873		
UKIP	Nicola Adams	315		
UKIP	Louise Howitt	290		
Turnout		5,225	65	

Central and Walton (2 seats)
Party	Candidate	Votes	%	±%
Conservative	Barbara Russel	1,075		
Conservative	Edward Sims	944		
Liberal Democrats	Mary Baldwin	752		
Labour	Michael Padmore	625		
Liberal Democrats	Marcus Rogers	570		
UKIP	Gavin Richardson	567		
UKIP	Joshua Richardson	481		
Labour	Grzegorz Popek	427		
Green	Christian Kaye	280		
Green	Colin Bloxham	211		
Turnout		5,932	66	

Coldharbour (3 seats)
Party	Candidate	Votes	%	±%
Liberal Democrats	Steven Lambert	1,781		
Liberal Democrats	Michael Smith	1,280		
Conservative	Andrew Cole	1,260		
Liberal Democrats	Stuart Jarvis	1,226		
Conservative	Zulifqar Ahmed	1,128		
Conservative	Paul Hughes	1,068		
UKIP	Deborah Huntley	958		
UKIP	Roger Huntley	860		
UKIP	Brian Wright	751		
Labour	Zard Khan	571		
Green	Jerdrzej Kulig	305		
Green	Stephen Brown	259		
Green	Alice Haylock	221		
Turnout		11,668	66	

Edlesborough
Party	Candidate	Votes	%	±%
Conservative	Chris Poll	unopposed		

Elmhurst (2 seats)
Party	Candidate	Votes	%	±%
Liberal Democrats	Raj Khan	729		
UKIP	Andrew Hetherington	666		
Liberal Democrats	Niknam Hussain	652		
Labour	David Caldwell	632		
Conservative	Ammer Raheel	604		
UKIP	Janet Reynolds	567		
Labour	Gary Paxton	516		
Conservative	Kevin Rogers	496		
Green	Suzannah McCarthy	220		
Green	Zachary-Rhys Nuttall	131		
Turnout		5,213	59	

Gatehouse (3 seats)
Party	Candidate	Votes	%	±%
Liberal Democrats	Anders Christensen	1,047		
Liberal Democrats	Tuffail Hussain	993		
Conservative	Paul Moore	959		
UKIP	Philip Hayes	932		
Conservative	Elizabeth Lumley	882		
Liberal Democrats	Samantha Pullen	879		
UKIP	Dorren Merridan	792		
Conservative	Mark Roberts	784		
Labour	Lucio Tangi	774		
UKIP	Frederick Merridan	770		
Green	Deborah King	345		
Green	Matthias Fiest	273		
Turnout		9,430	56	

Great Brickhill and Newton Longville (2 seats)
Party	Candidate	Votes	%	±%
Conservative	Neil Blake	2,099		
Conservative	Benjamin Everitt	1,986		
UKIP	Deborah Howard	727		
Green	Timothy Welch	683		
Turnout		5,495	73	

Great Horwood
Party	Candidate	Votes	%	±%
Conservative	Beville Stanier	1,323	71.4	
Green	Alexandra Stubbings	529	28.6	
Majority		794	42.8	
Turnout		1,852	73	

Grendon Underwood and Brill
Party	Candidate	Votes	%	±%
Conservative	John Cartwright	1,068	54.7	
UKIP	James McBeth	427	21.9	
Green	Nicholas Jones	246	12.6	
Liberal Democrats	Gareth Davies	213	10.9	
Majority		641	32.8	
Turnout		1,954	73	

Haddenham and Stone (3 seats)
Party	Candidate	Votes	%	±%
Conservative	Judith Brandis	2,677		
Conservative	Brian Foster	2,075		
Conservative	Michael Edmonds	1,681		
Green	David Lyons	1,063		
Independent	Mark Bale	1,037		
UKIP	Thomas Newton	1,031		
UKIP	Jonathan Evred	931		
Independent	Kenneth Brown	848		
Liberal Democrats	Elizabeth Melling	771		
Green	Gregory Smith	673		
UKIP	Kevin Wise	600		
Green	Jonathan Green	575		
Turnout		13,962	72	

Long Crendon
Party	Candidate	Votes	%	±%
Conservative	Mike Hawkett	1,083	58.7	
Green	Michael Le Brun	265	14.4	
UKIP	Colin Evered	257	13.9	
Labour	Margaret Liggett	240	13.0	
Majority		818	44.3	
Turnout		1,845	72	

Luffield Abbey
Party	Candidate	Votes	%	±%
Conservative	Warren Whyte	952	63.9	
Green	Nicola Smith	330	22.1	
UKIP	Evangeline Wise	208	14.0	
Majority		622	41.8	
Turnout		1,490	68	

Mandeville and Elm Farm (3 seats)
Party	Candidate	Votes	%	±%
Conservative	Susanne Chapple	1,955		
Conservative	Jennifer Bloom	1,784		
Conservative	Roger King	1,683		
UKIP	Heather Adams	1,047		
UKIP	Kim Birchinall	980		
UKIP	Amiee Gibson	895		
Labour	Philip Jacques	798		
Liberal Democrats	Richard Lloyd	644		
Liberal Democrats	Alan Sherwell	582		
Liberal Democrats	Peter Vernon	506		
Green	Coral Simpson	416		
Green	Gregory Smith	405		
Green	Haidee Harrison	376		
Turnout		12,071	66	

Marsh Gibbon
Party	Candidate	Votes	%	±%
Conservative	Angela Macpherson	1,026	56.1	
Liberal Democrats	Ian Metherell	413	22.6	
UKIP	Andrew Good	389	21.3	
Majority		613	33.5	
Turnout		1,828	71	

Oakfield and Bierton (3 seats)
Party	Candidate	Votes	%	±%
Liberal Democrats	Julie Ward	1,221		
Liberal Democrats	Alison Harrison	1,093		
Conservative	Mary Stamp	1,059		
Conservative	Peter Gwilliams	1,031		
Conservative	Denise Summers	1,019		
UKIP	Sheila Cotton	1,004		
Liberal Democrats	Mark Willis	929		
UKIP	Martin Norris	771		
UKIP	Ann Day	758		
Labour	Robert McNickle	676		
Green	Joanne Hodge	420		
Turnout		9,981	69	

Oakley
Party	Candidate	Votes	%	±%
Conservative	Michael Rand	1,280	78.4	
UKIP	William Bate	353	21.6	
Majority		927	56.8	
Turnout		1,633	75	

Pitstone and Cheddington (2 seats)
Party	Candidate	Votes	%	±%
Conservative	Sandra Jenkins	2,035		
Conservative	Derek Town	1,810		
Green	Johanna Wheeler	839		
Liberal Democrats	David Evershed	715		
UKIP	Robyn Adams	679		
Green	Mary Hodgkiss	456		
Turnout		6,534	72	

Quainton
Party	Candidate	Votes	%	±%
Conservative	Kevin Hewson	1,023	54.6	
Independent	Robert Hunter	432	23.1	
UKIP	James Styles	418	22.3	
Majority		591	31.5	
Turnout		1,873	76	

Riverside (3 seats)
Party	Candidate	Votes	%	±%
UKIP	Christopher Adams	1,142		
Conservative	Nicholas Lewis	988		
UKIP	Andrew Huxley	918		
Conservative	Samantha North	895		
UKIP	Graham Cadle	828		
Conservative	Nadeem Gulraiz	716		
Labour	Josephine Caldwell	566		
Liberal Democrats	Shoshana Willetts	495		
Liberal Democrats	Martin Farrow	486		
Liberal Democrats	Mohammed Azam	471		
Turnout		7,505	57	

Southcourt (2 seats)
Party	Candidate	Votes	%	±%
Liberal Democrats	Peter Agoro	772		
Labour	Mark Bateman	604		
Conservative	Akhmad Hussain	586		
UKIP	Roy Black	560		
Conservative	Sarah Sproat	547		
Liberal Democrats	Sally-Anne Jarvis	522		
UKIP	Brett Steptowe	432		
Labour	Tanya Warshaw	398		
Green	Clare Butler	152		
Green	Richard Eckersely	93		
Turnout		4,666	57	

Steeple Claydon
Party	Candidate	Votes	%	±%
Conservative	John Chilver	933	56.0	
UKIP	Frank Mahon	449	27.0	
Green	Emma Simpson	284	17.0	
Majority		484	29.0	
Turnout		1,666	69	

Stewkley
Party	Candidate	Votes	%	±%
Conservative	Janet Blake	1,221	63.4	
Green	Hannah Lett	422	21.9	
UKIP	Amethyst Sharman	284	14.7	
Majority		799	41.5	
Turnout		1,927	74	

Tingewick
Party	Candidate	Votes	%	±%
Conservative	Patrick Fealey	1,154	65.0	
UKIP	Simon Strutt	340	19.1	
Green	Rory Hodgson	282	15.9	
Majority		814	45.9	
Turnout		1,776	69	

Waddesdon
Party	Candidate	Votes	%	±%
Conservative	Paul Irwin	799	50.2	
UKIP	Gary Good	402	25.2	
Liberal Democrats	David Vick	392	24.6	
Majority		397	25.0	
Turnout		1,593	70	

Walton Court and Hawkslade (2 seats)
Party	Candidate	Votes	%	±%
UKIP	Brian Adams	805		
Conservative	Gary Powell	714		
Conservative	Sophie Vaughan-Evans	702		
Liberal Democrats	Ranula Takodra	659		
Liberal Democrats	Steven Kennell	648		
Labour	Luke Warshaw	567		
UKIP	Jason Wise	538		
Turnout		4,633	60	

Watermead
Party	Candidate	Votes	%	±%
Conservative	Ashley Bond	825	49.3	
Liberal Democrats	Lisa Smith	494	29.5	
UKIP	Heather Elliott	354	21.2	
Majority		331	19.8	
Turnout		1,673	72	

Wendover and Halton (3 seats)
Party	Candidate	Votes	%	±%
Conservative	Stephen Bowles	2,374		
Conservative	Peter Strachan	2,168		
Conservative	Andrew Southam	1,820		
UKIP	Susan Hetherington	1,392		
UKIP	Desmond Anning	1,359		
UKIP	Marc Ruggles	1,124		
Green	Tom Hodge	1,057		
Green	Christopher Peeler	974		
Liberal Democrats	Lloyd Harris	828		
Green	William Spencer	504		
Turnout		13,600	73	

Wing
Party	Candidate	Votes	%	±%
Conservative	Dorothea Glover	1,210	75.5	
UKIP	Barry Walton	392	24.5	
Majority		818	51.0	
Turnout		1,602	70	

Wingrave
Party	Candidate	Votes	%	±%
Independent	Peter Cooper	828	46.8	
Conservative	Richard Withey	540	30.5	
UKIP	Nicholas Griffin	208	11.8	
Green	Mark Wheeler	194	11.0	
Majority		288	16.3	
Turnout		1,770		

Winslow (2 seats)
Party	Candidate	Votes	%	±%
Liberal Democrats	Llewellyn Monger	1,545		
Conservative	Susan Renshell	1,351		
Liberal Democrats	Patricia Cawte	1,248		
Conservative	Brian Speed	973		
UKIP	Amy Howitt	394		
UKIP	Margaret Price	324		
Green	Frazer Payne	309		
Green	Mary Hunt	276		
Turnout		6,420		

== Changes between 2015 and 2019 ==
=== By-elections ===
==== Grendon Underwood and Brill ====
A by-election was held in Grendon Underwood and Brill on 23 December 2015 after the death of Conservative councillor and former leader of the council John Cartwright. The seat was held for the Conservatives by Cameron Branston with a majority of 51 votes over Liberal Democrat Julian Newman.

Grendon Underwood and Brill by-election 23 December 2015
Party	Candidate	Votes	%	±%
Conservative	Anthony Cameron Branston	326	43.5	−11.2
Liberal Democrats	Julian Newman	275	36.7	+25.8
UKIP	Gary Good	148	19.8	−2.1
Majority		51	6.8	−26.0
Turnout		749	28.8	−44
Conservative hold		Swing		

==== Elmhurst ====
A by-election was held in Elmhurst on 6 April 2017 after the resignation of UK Independence Party councillor Andy Hetherington. The seat was won for the Liberal Democrats by Susan Morgan with a majority of 634 seats over Labour's Gary Andrew Paxton.

Elmhurst by-election 6 April 2017
Party	Candidate	Votes	%	±%
Liberal Democrats	Susan Morgan	785	63.5	+37.9
Labour	Gary Andrew Paxton	151	12.2	−10.0
Conservative	Ammer Raheel	147	11.9	−9.3
UKIP	Philip Peter Gomm	111	9.0	−14.4
Green	Nigel Antony Foster	43	3.5	−4.2
Majority		634	51.3	
Turnout		1,244	27	
Liberal Democrats gain from UKIP		Swing		

==== Wendover and Halton ====
A by-election was held in Wendover and Halton on 4 May 2017 after the resignation of Conservative councillor Andrew Southam. This was held alongside the Buckinghamshire County Council election on the same date. The seat was won for the Conservatives by Richard Allan Newcombe with a majority of 823 seats over Labour's Cath Collier.

Wendover and Halton by-election 4 May 2017
Party	Candidate	Votes	%	±%
Conservative	Richard Allan Newcombe	1,240	51	
Labour	Cath Collier	417	17	
Liberal Democrats	Ashley Richard Morgan	298	12	
UKIP	Des Anning	273	11	
Green	Tom Peter Hodge	227	9	
Turnout		2,455		
Conservative hold		Swing		

==== Central & Walton ====
A by-election was held in Central & Walton on 22 March 2018 following the resignation in February of Conservative councillor Edward Sims. The Liberal Democrats' Waheed Raja gained the seat.

==== Quainton ====
A by-election is expected in Quainton following the death of Kevin Hewson (Conservative) in February 2018.

=== Changes in affiliation ===
Tom Hunter-Watts left the Conservative Party and on 5 May 2017 joined the Lib Dems.

On 9 May 2017, all three of UKIP's remaining councillors left the party.
