= 1999 Aylesbury Vale District Council election =

1999 UK local government election

The 1999 Aylesbury Vale District Council election took place on 6 May 1999 to elect members of Aylesbury Vale District Council in Buckinghamshire, England. The whole council was up for election and the Liberal Democrats lost overall control of the council to no overall control.

== Results ==
Aylesbury Vale local election result 1999
Party	Seats	Gains	Losses	Net gain/loss	Seats %	Votes %	Votes	+/−
Liberal Democrats	26			-4	44.8			
Conservative	24			+9	41.4			
Independent	7			-2	12.1			
Labour	1			-3	1.7			
