= Aylesbury Vale District Council =

Type
- Type: Non-Metropolitan District

History
- Disbanded: 2020
- Succeeded by: Buckinghamshire Council

Structure
- Seats: 59 councillors
- Length of term: 4 years

Elections
- Last election: 7 May 2015

Website
- www.aylesburyvaledc.gov.uk

Aylesbury Vale District Council was the non-metropolitan second tier authority for Aylesbury Vale in Buckinghamshire. It was responsible for housing, waste collection, council tax, local planning, licensing and cemeteries, while Buckinghamshire County Council was responsible for other business. From 1 April 2020, it was merged with Buckinghamshire County Council, Chiltern District Council, South Bucks District Council and Wycombe District Council to create a new unitary authority.
