= Fulwell =

Fulwell may refer to:

- Fulwell, London
- Fulwell, Oxfordshire
- Fulwell, Sunderland
- Fulwell & Westbury railway station
