= Gagingwell =

Hamlet in Oxfordshire, England

Coordinates: 51°55′23″N 1°24′28″W

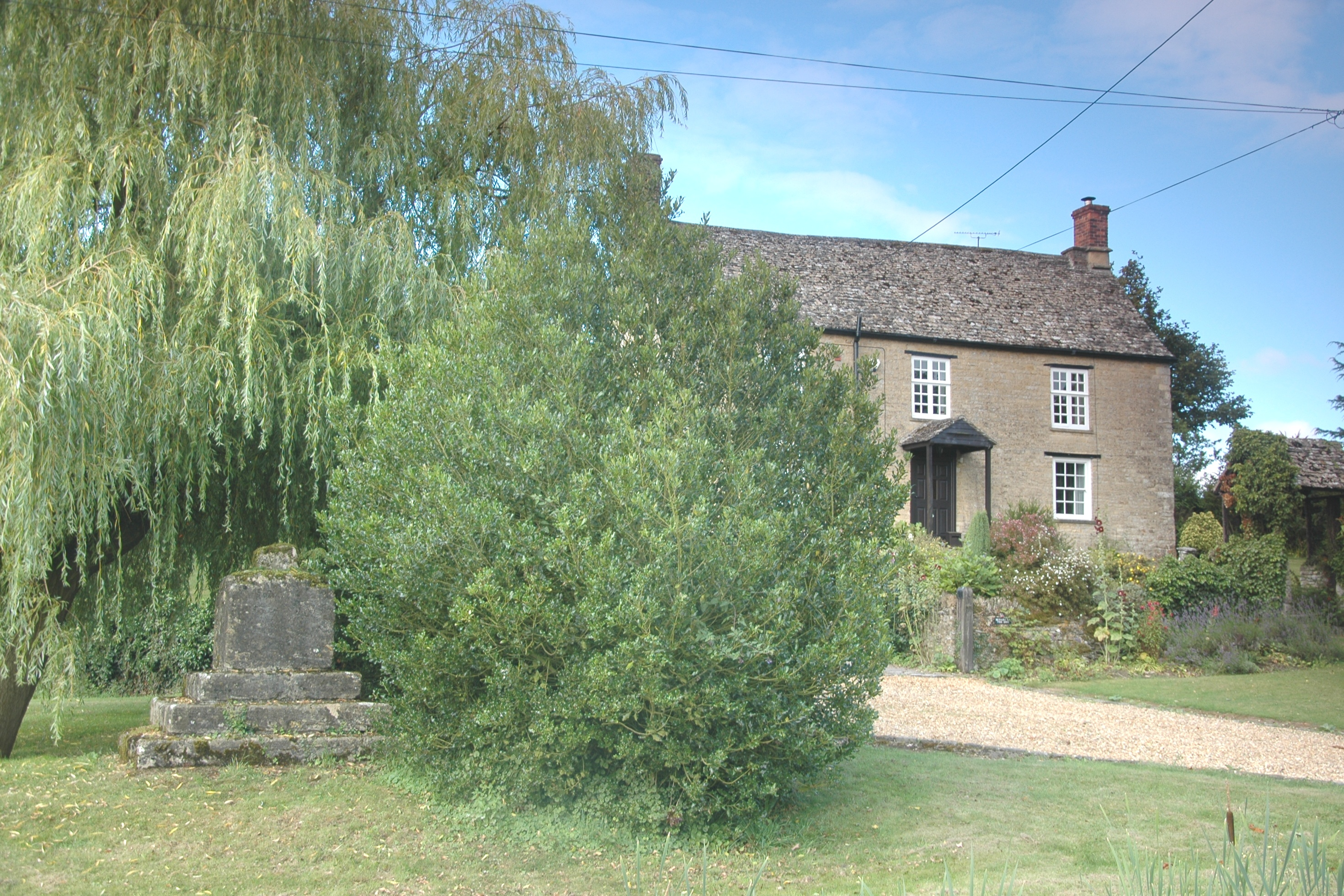
- Remains of Medieval wayside cross (left) in front of Wadham House (right)

- Location within Oxfordshire
- OS grid reference: SP408251
- Civil parish: Enstone
- District: West Oxfordshire
- Shire county: Oxfordshire
- Region: South East
- Country: England
- Sovereign state: United Kingdom
- Post town: Chipping Norton
- Postcode district: OX7
- Dialling code: 01608
- Police: Thames Valley
- Fire: Oxfordshire
- Ambulance: South Central
- UK Parliament: Witney
- Website: EnstoneVillage.co.uk

Gagingwell is a hamlet in West Oxfordshire, about 6 miles (10 km) east of Chipping Norton and about 1.8 miles (3 km) east of Enstone. The hamlet surrounds a group of springs that give rise to a brook, which flows southwards almost 1 mile (1.6 km) to join the River Glyme just downstream of the hamlet of Radford.

== History ==
In the late Middle Ages a stone wayside cross was built next to one of the springs. Its surviving plinth and steps are a scheduled monument and a Grade II* listed building. Gagingwell's few houses are late 17th or 18th century stone buildings with roofs of Stonesfield Slate or, in one case, thatch. The hamlet has also two 18th or early 19th century stone-built barns. Gagingwell is on the main road between Enstone and Bicester. The road was turnpiked in 1793, disturnpiked in 1876 and is now classified as the B4030. In 1848 Gagingwell's population was reckoned to be 57 people.

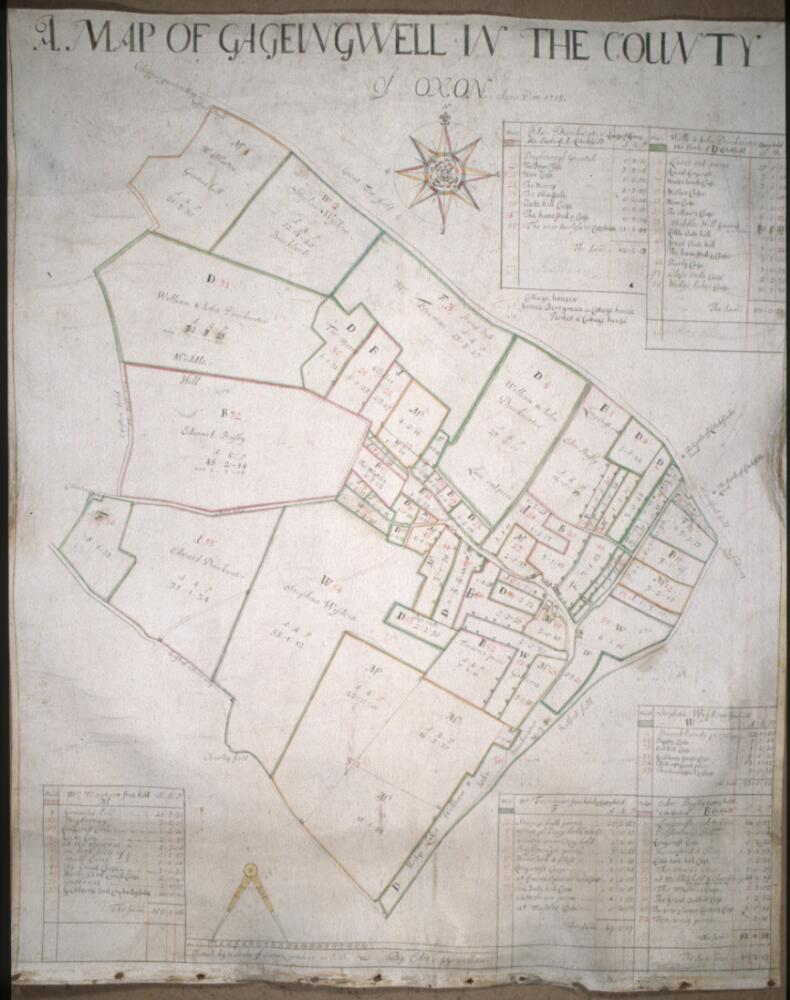
Map of “Gageingwell “ in the County of Oxon in 1713
