= Lidstone =

Hamlet in Oxfordshire, England

Coordinates: 51.9197°N 1.4852°W

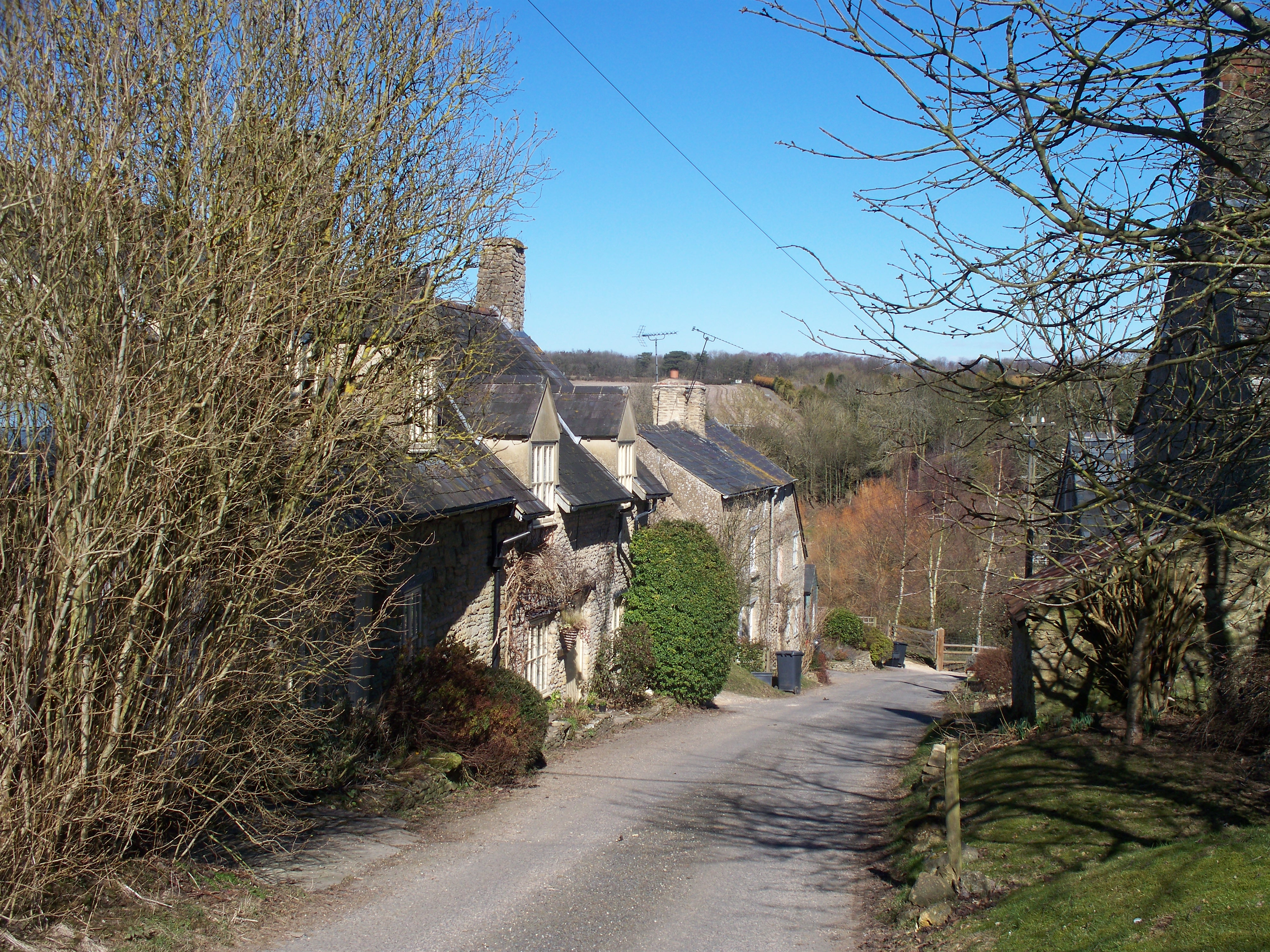
- Cottages in Lidstone

- Location within Oxfordshire
- OS grid reference: SP355247
- Civil parish: Enstone
- District: West Oxfordshire
- Shire county: Oxfordshire
- Region: South East
- Country: England
- Sovereign state: United Kingdom
- Post town: Chipping Norton
- Postcode district: OX7
- Dialling code: 01608
- Police: Thames Valley
- Fire: Oxfordshire
- Ambulance: South Central
- UK Parliament: Witney
- Website: Enstone Parish

Lidstone is a hamlet on the River Glyme in Oxfordshire, about 3 miles (5 km) east of Chipping Norton. The hamlet is in Enstone civil parish, about 1 1/4 miles (2 km) west of Neat Enstone.

== Archaeology ==
In Round Hill Field on a ridge about 700 yards (640 m) south of Lidstone is a Bronze Age bowl barrow. It is 105 feet (32 m) in diameter and 2 feet (0.6 m) high. Originally it would have been substantially higher, and would have been created from spoil dug from a circular quarry trench 6 1/2 feet (2 m) deep. The trench has become filled in but will have survived as a buried feature. The barrow is the most northerly of a line of three that form a line between Lidstone and the village of Spelsbury. It is a scheduled monument. In the middle of the barrow is an Ordnance Survey triangulation station.

== Manor ==
By 1279 there was a hide of land at Lidstone that was part of the manor of Heythrop.

== Mill ==
Lidstone had a large watermill on the Glyme. It had the largest-diameter waterwheel in Oxfordshire: an overshot wheel 24 feet (7.3 m) in diameter and 4 feet (1.2 m) wide. Via a 15-foot (4.6 m) pitwheel it drove three pairs of millstones. The mill had its own bread oven. The mill was dismantled in 1976 and its machinery taken into storage, but the large iron waterwheel was left in place.

== Sources ==
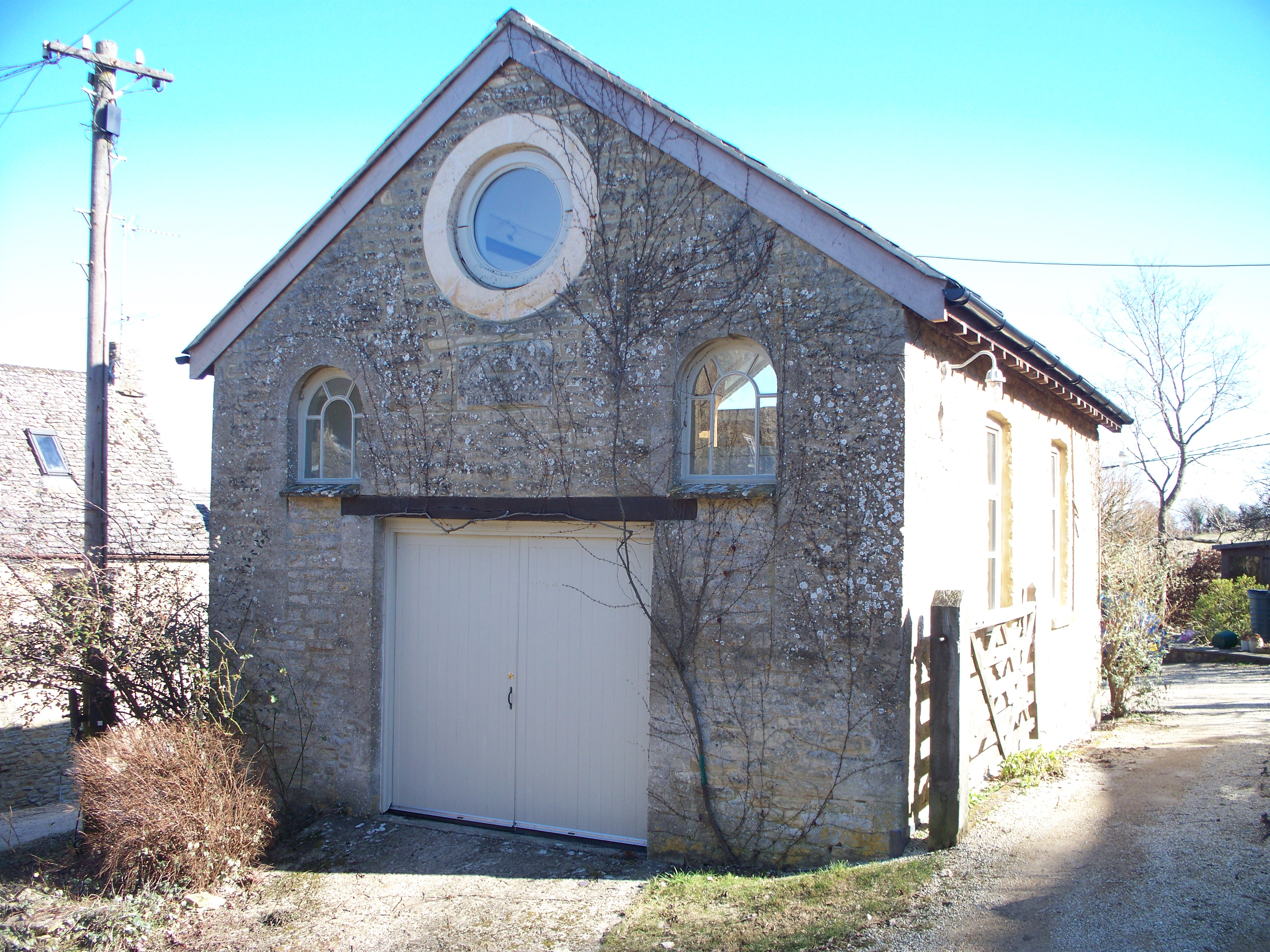
19th-century former chapel in Lidstone, now converted into a private garage

- Crossley, Alan (ed.); Baggs, A.P.; Colvin, Christina; Colvin, H.M.; Cooper, Janet; Day, C.J.; Selwyn, Nesta; Tomkinson, A. (1983). "Heythrop". A History of the County of Oxford. Victoria County History. Vol. 11: Wootton Hundred (northern part). pp. 131–143.
- Foreman, Wilfrid (1983). Oxfordshire Mills. Chichester: Phillimore & Co Ltd. pp. 45, 111. ISBN 0-85033-441-1.
- Harden, D.B. (1954). "Scheduled Monuments in Oxfordshire". Oxoniensia. XIX. Oxford: Oxford Architectural and Historical Society: 137–145.
