= Heythrop Zoological Gardens =

Zoo in England

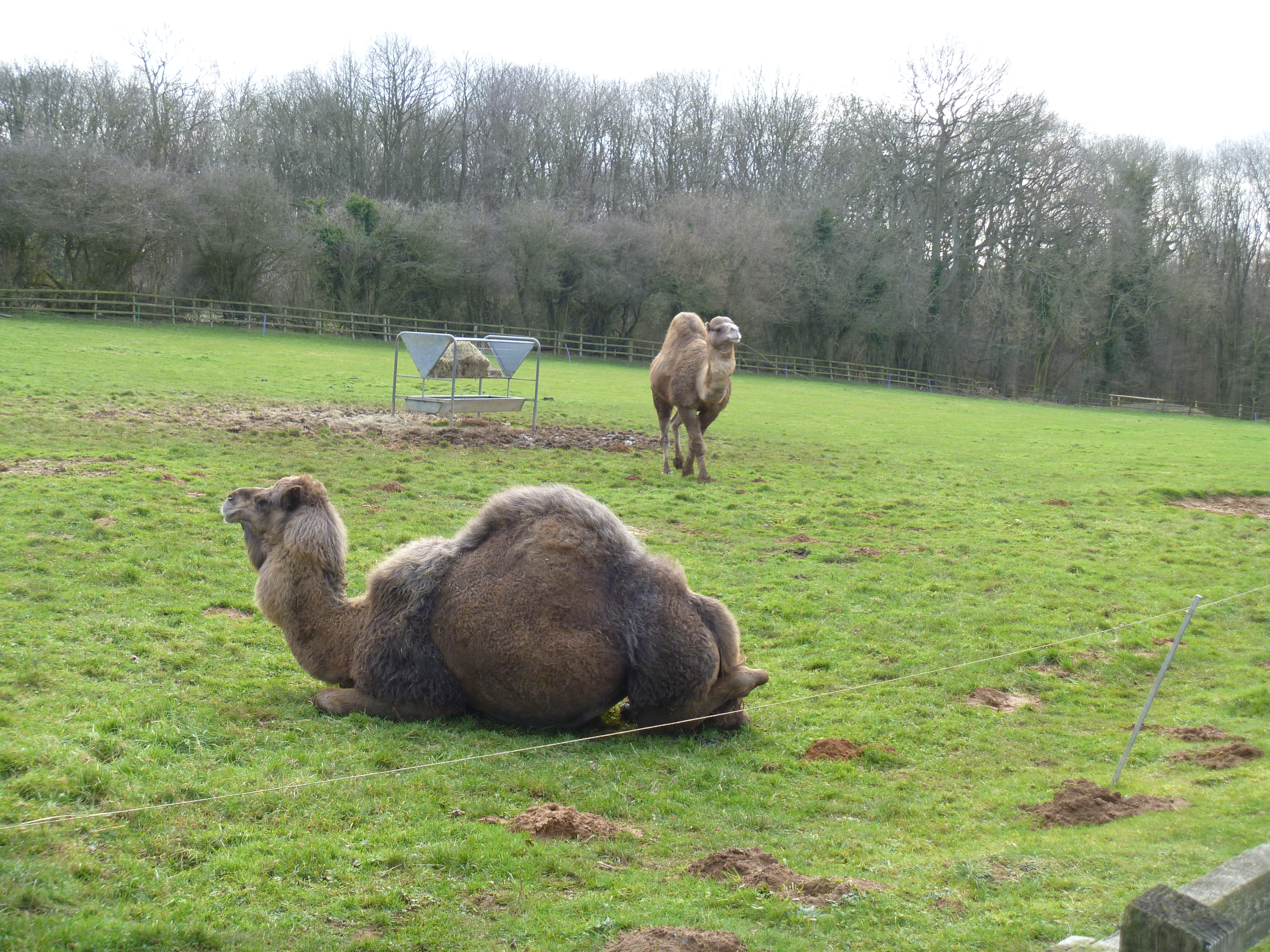
- Camels at the zoo
- Interactive map of Heythrop Zoological Gardens
- 51°56′41″N 1°27′33″W
- Location: Heythrop, Oxfordshire, England
- No. of animals: 78 (in 2018)
- No. of species: 17 (in 2018)
- Website: www.heythropzoologicalgardens.org

Heythrop Zoological Gardens was a private zoo and animal training centre in Heythrop, near Chipping Norton, Oxfordshire. The zoo had the largest private collection of exotic animals in the United Kingdom. The site also housed Amazing Animals, an animal training company that provided exotic animals for the film industry. The company provided the majority of "zoo–type" animals for British film sets.

The Zoo and its film and TV arm was founded by Jim and Sally Clubb in 1977. It operated for nearly 50 years until its closure in March 2026 when the original owner retired.

== Zoo ==
Construction of Heythrop Zoological Gardens began in 1990 at a site close to Heythrop Park in Heythrop, near Chipping Norton, Oxfordshire. The owners stated they were inspired architecturally by London Zoo, but built to modern animal welfare standards. Plans for an extension of the Zoo in 2017 to add a new lion enclosure and a residential house were rejected due to their visual impact on the surrounding countryside. In 2018 the zoo had seven lions, five tigers, six leopards, two brown bears, six wolves, nine camels, four zebras, two pygmy hippos, ten antelope, eight monkeys, four kangaroos, four crocodiles, three alligators, two Cuvier's dwarf caiman, two bearded lizards, two cobras and a gila monster. It was the largest private collection of exotic animals in the country.

The Zoo was operated as a private collection, but from 2007 it ran a limited number of open days for public admissions to view the animals and meet their trainers. The Zoo also ran animal encounter visits, "zookeeper for a day" experiences and animal training courses. The site also hosted parties and sent animals on visits to colleges and care homes. On the decision to remain private, co-owner Jim Clubb stated in 2019 that "because of the dynamic of Heythrop Zoological Gardens, we chose not to become a public zoo. We are first and foremost an animal training centre".

== Amazing Animals ==
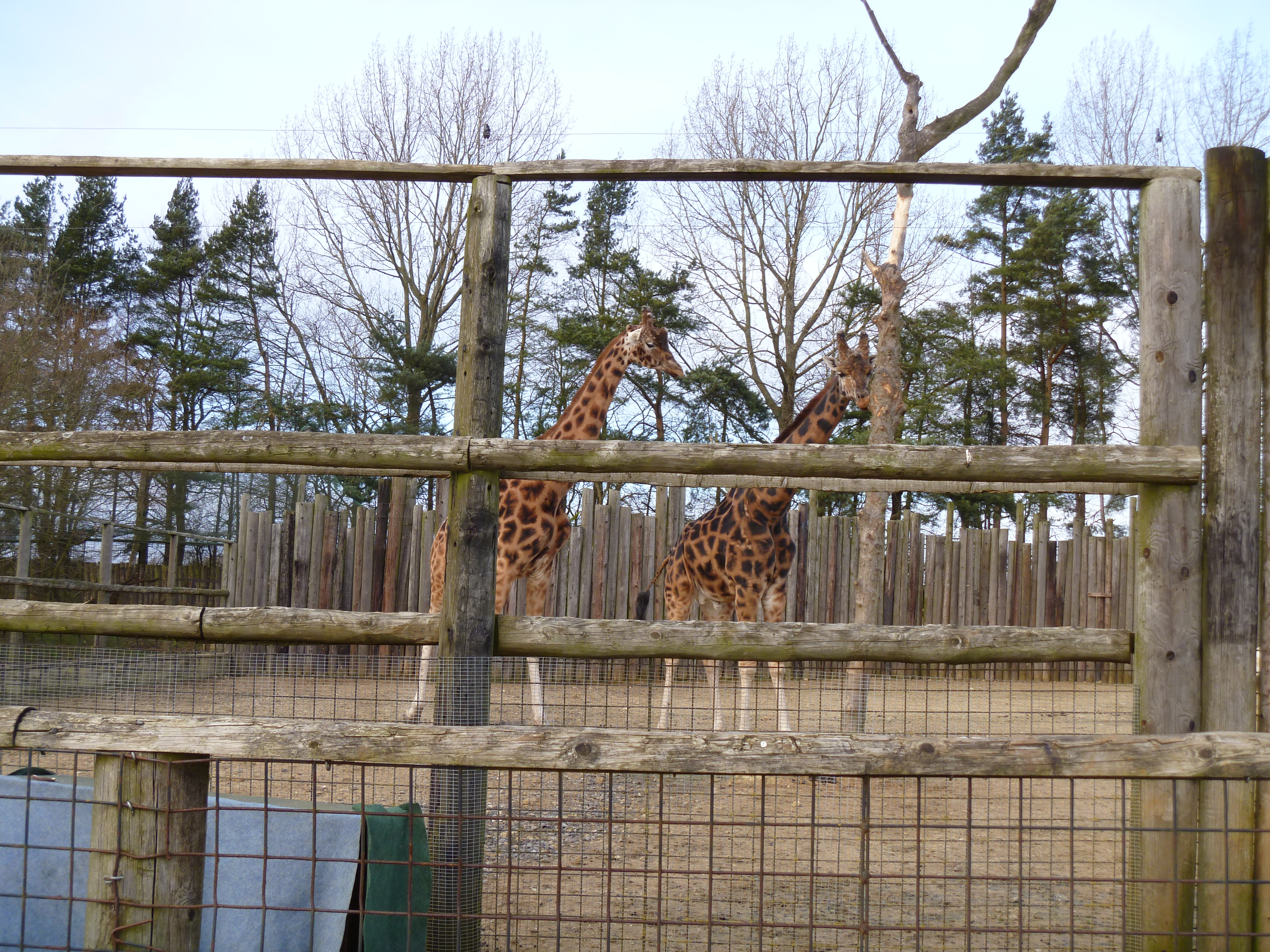
Giraffes at the zoo

The Zoo was also the base of Amazing Animals, a company run by Jim and Sally Clubb that hired out trained animals for films, television and private events. The company claimed that the zoo location is the largest private zoo in Europe specifically built to meet the needs of film and television production. It was the largest trainer and supplier of animals to the UK film and television industry and provided most of the "zoo–type" animals that appeared on film sets in the UK. As well as providing animals, the company had its own studio space on site with greenscreen capabilities. Around half of its film and TV work was carried out on site.

Amazing Animals provided animals for Holmes & Watson, The Legend of Tarzan, Doctor Who and many other film and television productions. The practice was not without controversy. Animal rights groups repeatedly called for a ban on the use of animals for film and television and naturalist Chris Packham specifically criticised Amazing Animals. In response, the Zoo's owners stated that they maintain high standards of animal welfare and have been "actively consulted with the creation of several pieces of animal legislation as well as educational initiatives in animal welfare and training".

In February 2019, two of the male penguins used by the company were "married" in a ceremony held at a wedding venue near the zoo. The pair, named Ferrari and Pringle, nested together each year, attempting to hatch a rock instead of an egg. The penguins appeared on chat shows The Jonathan Ross Show and Alan Carr: Chatty Man; in the television series Our Zoo; and at the red carpet premiere of the film Mr. Popper's Penguins.

Amazing Animals provided five Humbolt penguins for the opening of an Ice Festival at the Liverpool One shopping complex in November 2012, where they were placed on an ice rink. The event was criticised by PETA as the species does not encounter ice in its natural habitat, the shores of Peru and Chile. A vet from the Heythrop Zoo stated "at no time have the penguins exhibited any distress in their surroundings".
