= Radford, Oxfordshire =

Hamlet in Oxfordshire, England

Coordinates: 51.9150°N 1.4076°W

Radford
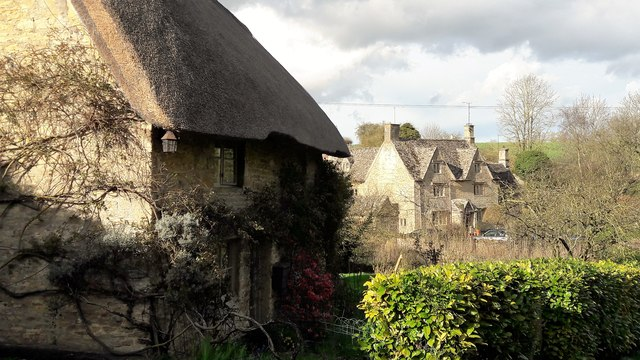
- Radford in 2017

- Location within Oxfordshire
- OS grid reference: SP4023
- Civil parish: Enstone
- District: West Oxfordshire
- Shire county: Oxfordshire
- Region: South East
- Country: England
- Sovereign state: United Kingdom
- Post town: Chipping Norton
- Postcode district: OX7
- Dialling code: 01608
- Police: Thames Valley
- Fire: Oxfordshire
- Ambulance: South Central
- UK Parliament: Witney
- Website: Enstone village website

Radford is a hamlet on the River Glyme in Enstone civil parish about 6 miles (10 km) east of Chipping Norton, Oxfordshire.

== History ==
In 1086, the manor of Radford, in the hundred of Shipton, Oxfordshire, was one of six manors held by Anchetil de Greye from William FitzOsbern, 1st Earl of Hereford. The Domesday Book entry records Ide(m) Anschtall(us) de Grai ten(et) III hid(ae) in Radeford... ("the same Anchetil de Greye holds three hides in Radford...".

Radford has a Roman Catholic chapel dedicated to the Holy Trinity, designed by A. W. N. Pugin in a Gothic Revival version of the Early English Gothic style of architecture, built in 1841.

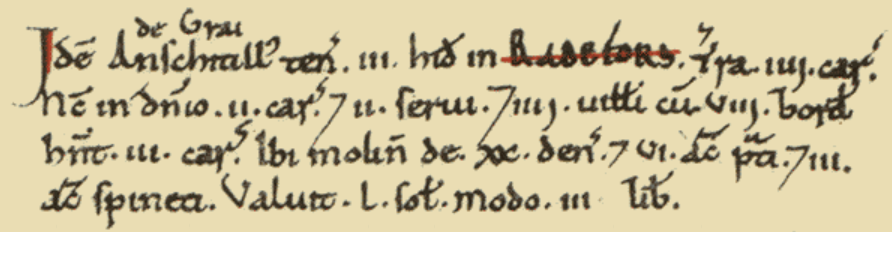
Domesday Book entry for Radford
