= Glyme Valley =

Protected area in Oxfordshire, England

Coordinates: 51.930°N 1.510°W

- Site of Special Scientific Interest
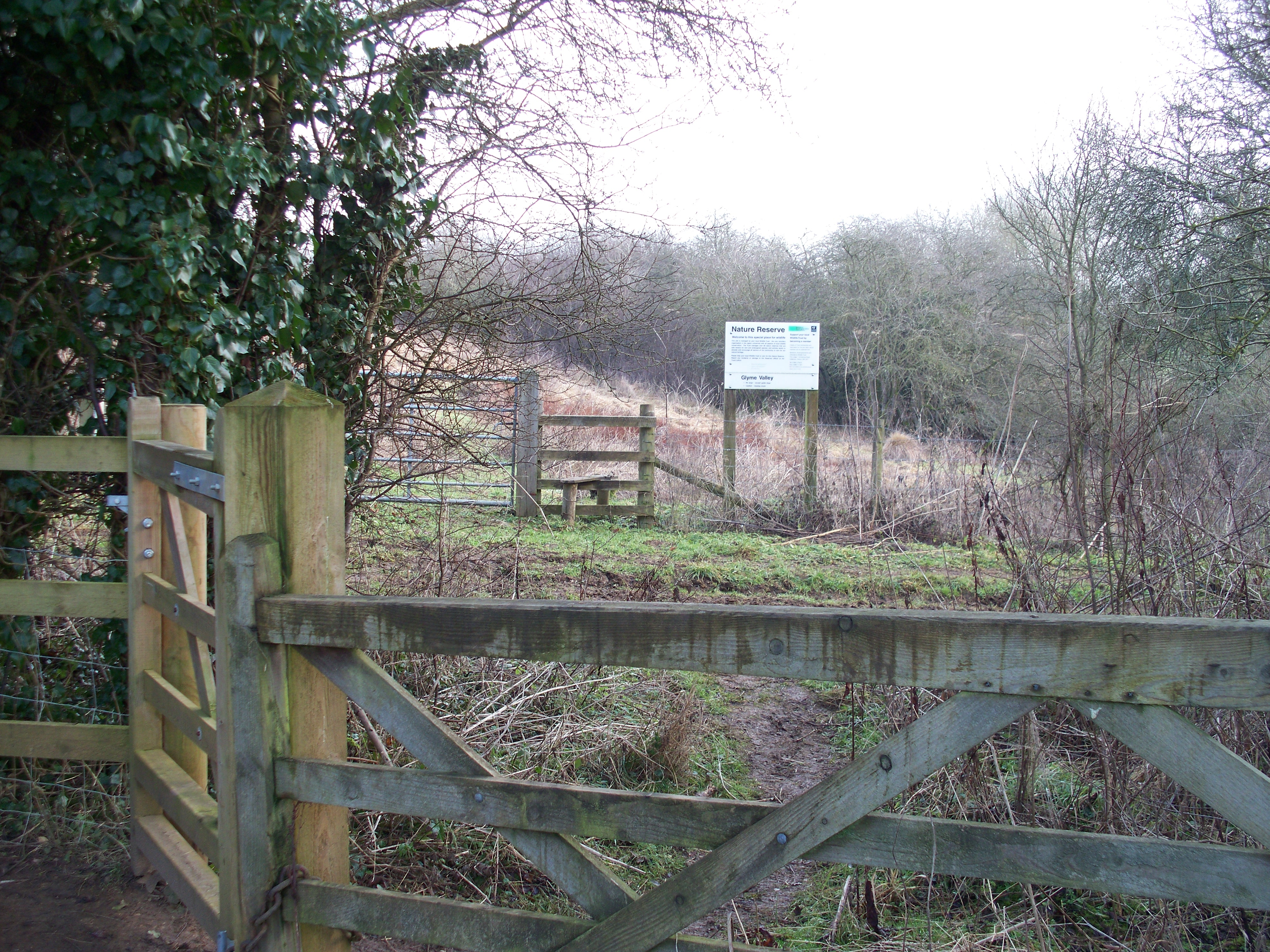
- Location of Glyme Valley.
- Area of search: Oxfordshire
- Grid reference: SP 338 258
- Interest: Biological
- Area: 28.9 hectares (71 acres)
- Notification date: 1994
- Location map: Magic Map

Glyme Valley is a 28.9-hectare (71-acre) biological Site of Special Scientific Interest east of Chipping Norton in Oxfordshire. An area of 3 hectares (7.4 acres) is a nature reserve managed by the Berkshire, Buckinghamshire and Oxfordshire Wildlife Trust

This linear site runs along two stretches of the valley of the River Glyme, with the upper area encompassing the river's headwaters. The diverse habitats include the river, ponds, fen, marshy grassland, limestone grassland, scrub and wet woodland. There is a large colony of meadow clary, a rare species which is listed in the British Red Data Book of Vascular Plants. There are several badger setts.
