= Sheila Stewart (author) =

- Born: Sheila McCairn; 6 January 1928; Appledore, Devon
- Died: 3 September 2014 (aged 86)
- Occupations: Author, teacher
- Spouse: Eric Stewart (m. 1952)
- Children: 3
- Writing career
- Genre: Social History

Sheila Stewart (6 January 1928 - 3 September 2014) was a British writer who chronicled the lives of rural working people using their own words. Her technique was based on extensive interviews, which allowed her to capture the words, phrases and expressions of her subjects and the localities and the periods in which they lived. Her works can be classified as social histories.

== Early life ==
She was born Sheila McCairn in Appledore, Devon to an unmarried mother and was left in the care of the Coxes, elderly and impoverished relatives. When she was three, she was taken to her first of many homes run under the supervision of the Waifs and Strays Society (now called The Children's Society). She was to spend all her childhood and youth in care. At nine, while at the Maurice Home for Girls in Ealing, she became a voracious reader. In early 1939 Stewart sat for and won a Scholarship to the County School, but it was decided that she would not be allowed to attend. Hence, she continued her studies at her local elementary school.

The Maurice Home was evacuated to Ascot in the summer of 1939. There her academic capabilities came to the attention of Miss Cory, the headmistress of the local village school. Miss Cory and the matron of the Home, Matron Bailey, were in favour of letting Stewart continue her education beyond the age of 14, the age at which Home girls left school to be trained for two years for positions in domestic service. This created considerable debate within the Society as allowing Stewart to continue her schooling might have given lead to resentment among the other girls and would also have put a strain on the Society's resources. However, with the strong backing of Miss Cory and Matron Bailey, the Society decided to allow to use her Scholarship to continue her education at the Bracknell grammar school.

She excelled at school and, in June 1944, she became the first Home girl to pass the Matriculation examination. Impressed with her performance, the Society decided to allow her to let her continue school for two more years towards the Higher School Certificate. Her example set a precedent and gave the Society the confidence to let other girls follow the same path.

== Career ==
After she left the care of the Society, she trained as a teacher at Bishop Otter College, Chichester and began her teaching career at Sibford School, near Banbury. While living there, she met Eric Stewart and they were married in 1952. After the birth of their children (Sarah (1955), Tim (1959) and Mathew (1962)), Stewart left her teaching position and started a private nursery school.

In 1967, after the publication of her first book, A Home from Home, a memoir of her early years, Stewart sold her school to concentrate on her writing. In her second book, Country Kate (1971), she displayed what was to become her style of storytelling. A portrait of an elderly woman, based on her own recollections of growing up in a Cotswold village before World War II, it contains significant portions written in Warwickshire dialect.

In 1975, Stewart published Country Courtship, a compendium of the courtship behaviours of countryfolk in the Warwickshire-Oxfordshire region during the late 19th and early 20th centuries. The material is related by a woman named 'Kate', but in the foreword to the book Stewart states that this 'Kate' is a composite character. She writes "I have collected anecdotes and details of Country Courtship from many sources and - with Kate's approval - retold them as if she, personally, had known the people and the circumstances concerned".

Lifting the Latch: A Life on the Land (1987) was constructed from a series of taped conversations with Montague Archibald Abbott (Mont Abbott or Old Mont), who for nearly eighty years lived and worked on the land near the parish of Enstone in Oxfordshire. It records the joys and tribulations of a country life that has long since vanished and also exposes the personal tragedy and rural hardship before the existence of the welfare state. Ramlin Rose: The Boatwoman's Story (1993) recounts the experiences of the women whose families lived and worked on the narrow boats that plied the canals of Britain.

On 27 Dec 1975, BBC Radio 4 aired Stewart's play The Taxman Cometh in its Thirty-Minute Theatre programme.

Stewart is one of the authors whose work is the subject of Dr. Jo Parnell's doctoral thesis on "docu-memoirs".

== Bibliography ==
- Stewart, Sheila (1967). A Home from Home. Longmans, Green & Co Ltd, 48 Grosvenor Street, London, W1: Longmans.
- Stewart, Sheila (1971). Country Kate. ISBN 9780900093289.
- Stewart, Sheila (1975). Country Courtship. The Roundhead Press (Publishers) Limited, Kineton, Warwick. ISBN 0-900093-54-4.
- Stewart, Sheila (1988). Lifting The Latch: A Life on the Land – Based on the Life of Mont Abbott of Enstone, Oxfordshire. Day Books. ISBN 978-0-9532213-3-2.
- Stewart, Sheila (1994). Ramlin Rose: The Boatwoman's Story. Oxford Paperbacks; New edition (May 19, 1994). ISBN 978-0192853028.
