= Old Chalford =

Hamlet in Oxfordshire, England

Coordinates: 51.929°N 1.503°W

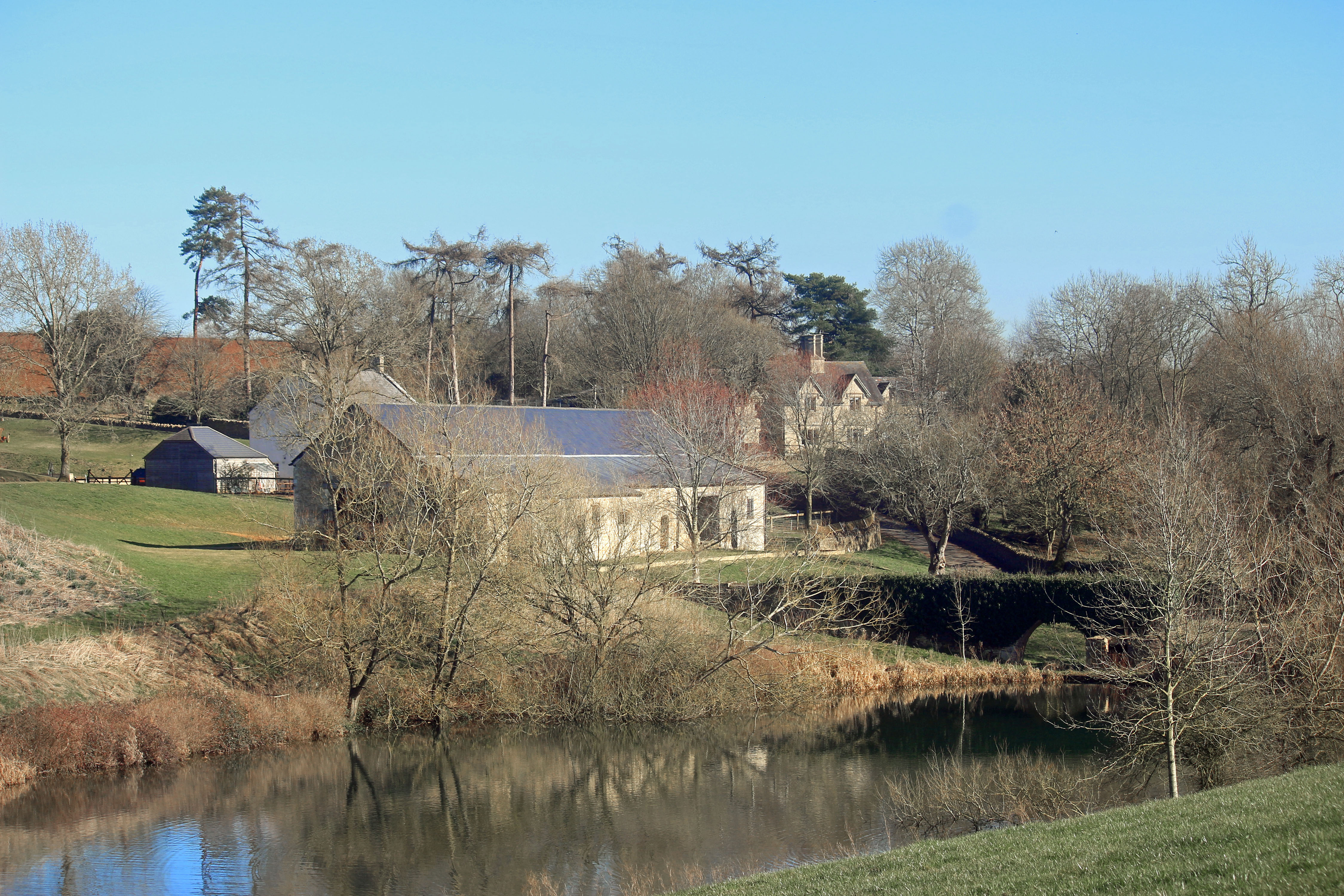
- Old Chalford

- Location within Oxfordshire
- OS grid reference: SP342258
- Civil parish: Enstone
- District: West Oxfordshire
- Shire county: Oxfordshire
- Region: South East
- Country: England
- Sovereign state: United Kingdom
- Post town: Chipping Norton
- Postcode district: OX7
- Dialling code: 01608
- Police: Thames Valley
- Fire: Oxfordshire
- Ambulance: South Central
- UK Parliament: Witney
- Website: Enstone village website

Old Chalford is a hamlet in Enstone civil parish, about 2 miles (3 km) east of Chipping Norton, Oxfordshire.

Old Chalford is on the River Glyme, which is dammed in the hamlet forming a number of ponds. The Wychwood Way long distance footpath passes through the hamlet. About 0.5 miles (800 m) southeast of Old Chalford are old earthworks and ruins of limestone walls which are the remains of the deserted medieval village of Nether Chalford.
