= Fulwell & Westbury railway station =

Former railway station in Buckinghamshire, England

Coordinates: 52.0073°N 1.0874°W

Fulwell & Westbury
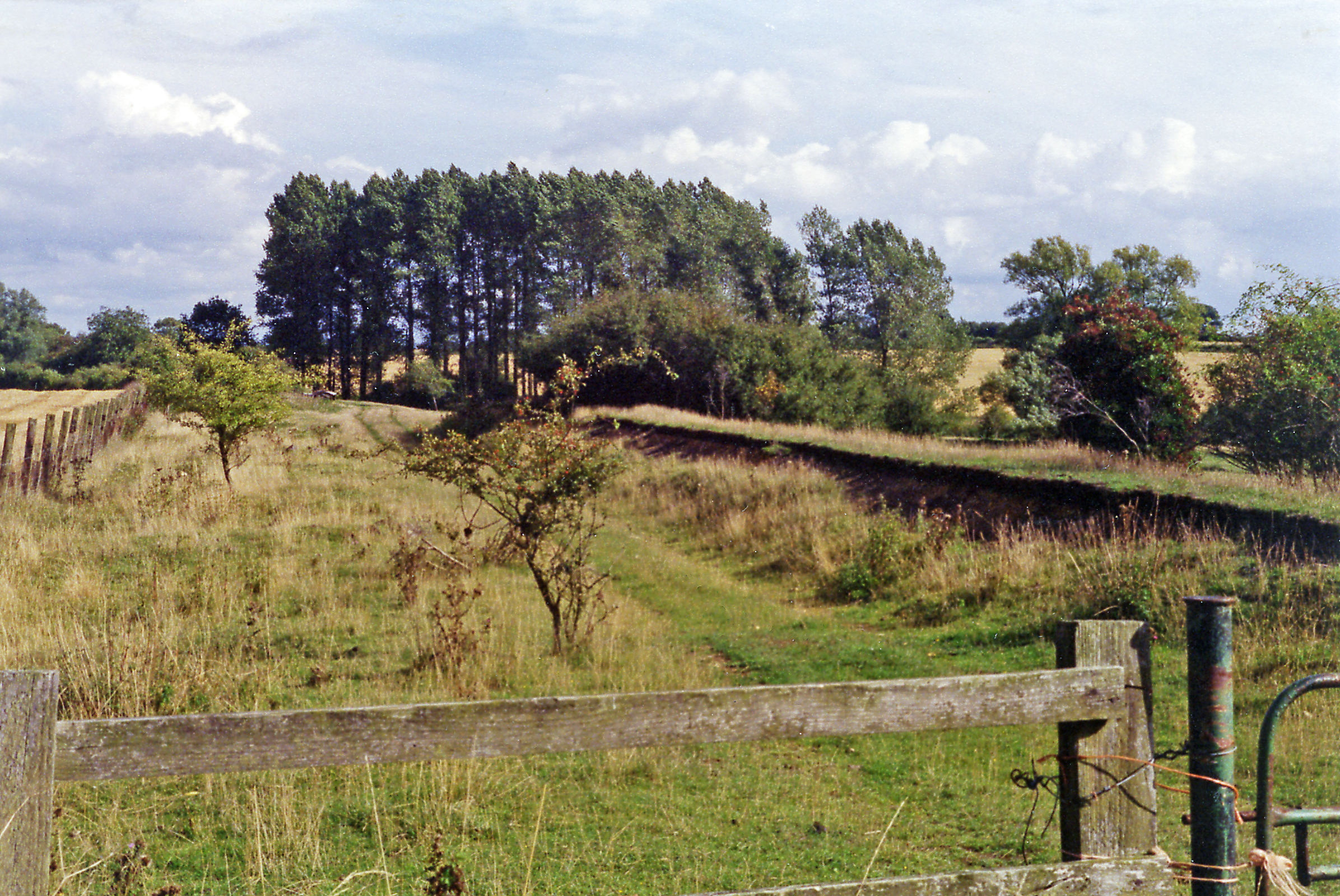
- The site of the station in 1994

General information
- Location: Westbury, Buckinghamshire; England
- Grid reference: SP628347
- Platforms: 1

Other information
- Status: Disused

History
- Original company: London & North Western Railway
- Pre-grouping: London & North Western Railway
- Post-grouping: London, Midland and Scottish Railway; London Midland Region of British Railways

Key dates
- 1 August 1879: Opened as Westbury Crossing
- 1 October 1880: Station renamed Fulwell & Westbury
- 2 January 1961: Station closed for passengers
- 2 December 1963: Station closed completely
Location

Fulwell & Westbury was a railway station in Buckinghamshire that served the village of Westbury and the hamlet of Fulwell in neighbouring Oxfordshire, England. It was opened in 1879 by the London & North Western Railway, which had taken over the line from the Buckinghamshire Railway that year. The station consisted of one platform, a ticket office, and two waiting rooms. The station was closed for passengers in 1961 and completely in December 1963.

== Routes ==
Preceding station	Disused railways	Following station
Brackley	London and North Western Railway; Buckinghamshire Railway	Water Stratford Halt

== Sources ==
- Butt, R. V. J. (October 1995). The Directory of Railway Stations: details every public and private passenger station, halt, platform and stopping place, past and present (1st ed.). Sparkford: Patrick Stephens Ltd. ISBN 978-1-85260-508-7. OCLC 60251199. OL 11956311M.
- Clinker, C.R. (October 1978). Clinker's Register of Closed Passenger Stations and Goods Depots in England, Scotland and Wales 1830–1977. Bristol, UK: Avon-AngliA Publications & Services. ISBN 0-905466-19-5.
- Davies, R.; Grant, M.D. (1984). Forgotten Railways: Chilterns and Cotswolds. Newton Abbot, UK: David St John Thomas. ISBN 0-946537-07-0.
- Kingscott, Geoffrey (2008). Lost Railways of Northamptonshire (Lost Railways Series). Newbury, UK: Countryside Books. ISBN 978-1-84674-108-1.
- Mitchell, Vic; Smith, Keith (2005). Oxford to Bletchley (Country Railway Routes). Midhurst, UK: Middleton Press. ISBN 978-1-904474-57-9.
- Simpson, Bill (1994). Banbury to Verney Junction Branch. Banbury, UK: Lamplight Publications. ISBN 978-1-899246-00-7.
