= Fulwell, Oxfordshire =

Hamlet in Oxfordshire, England

Coordinates: 51.9052°N 1.4511°W

Fulwell
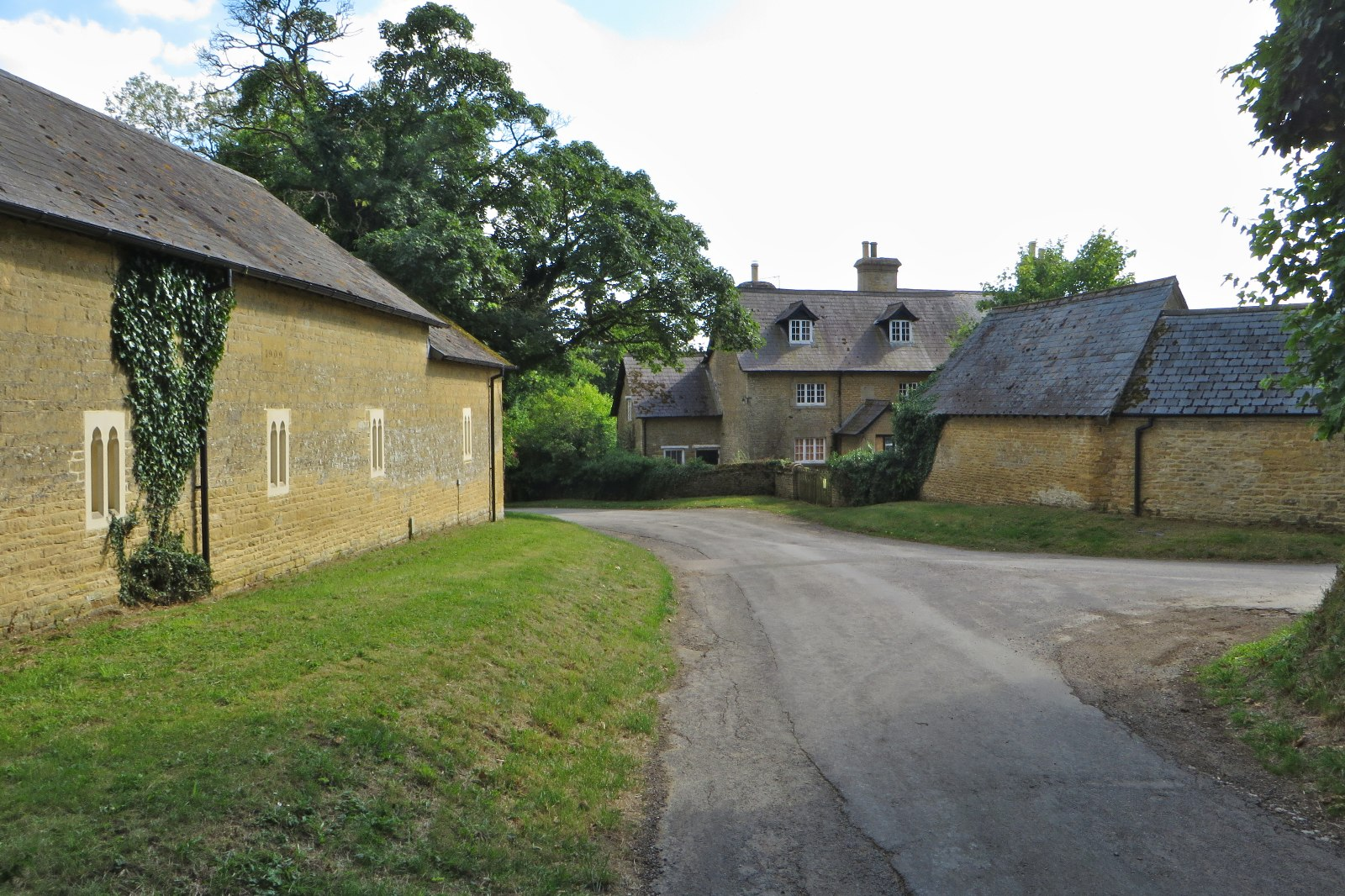
- Fulwell hamlet

- Location within Oxfordshire
- OS grid reference: SP3723
- Civil parish: Enstone
- District: West Oxfordshire
- Shire county: Oxfordshire
- Region: South East
- Country: England
- Sovereign state: United Kingdom
- Post town: Chipping Norton
- Postcode district: OX7
- Dialling code: 01608
- Police: Thames Valley
- Fire: Oxfordshire
- Ambulance: South Central
- UK Parliament: Witney
- Website: Enstone village website

Fulwell is a hamlet in the civil parish of Enstone in Oxfordshire, England. It lies about 4.5 miles (7 km) southeast of Chipping Norton. Fulwell's toponym is derived from its "foul well". The hamlet was part of the manor of Spelsbury in the ancient parish and later civil parish of Spelsbury. In 1985 Fulwell was transferred to the civil parish of Enstone.
