= Heythrop =

Village in Oxfordshire, England

Coordinates: 51.950°N 1.491°W

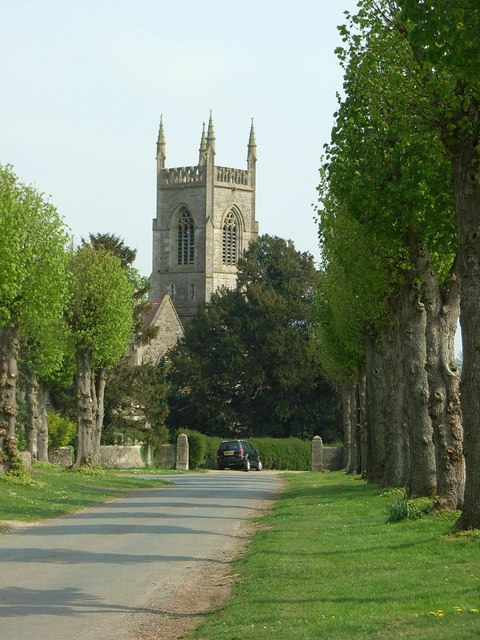
- St Nicholas' parish church

- Location within Oxfordshire
- Population: 93 (2001 Census)
- OS grid reference: SP3527
- Civil parish: Heythrop
- District: West Oxfordshire
- Shire county: Oxfordshire
- Region: South East
- Country: England
- Sovereign state: United Kingdom
- Post town: Chipping Norton
- Postcode district: OX7
- Dialling code: 01608
- Police: Thames Valley
- Fire: Oxfordshire
- Ambulance: South Central
- UK Parliament: Banbury

Heythrop is a village and civil parish just over 2 miles (3 km) east of Chipping Norton, Oxfordshire. The parish includes the hamlet of Dunthrop. The 2001 Census recorded the parish population as 93.

== History ==
Heythrop had a Norman parish church of Saint Nicholas, but the nave has been demolished and only the chancel has been preserved as a mortuary chapel. The chapel's west doorway was the south doorway of the former nave. In 1657 an attempt to merge the Benefices of Enstone and Heythrop was abandoned in the face of local opposition. In 1923 the incumbent of Heythrop ceased to live in the parish and in 1964 it and Enstone were finally merged. In 2001 the Benefice of Enstone and Heythrop merged with that of Ascott-under-Wychwood, Chadlington, and Spelsbury to form the Chase Benefice.

Heythrop House in Heythrop Park was built from 1706 onwards by the architect Thomas Archer for Charles Talbot, 1st Duke of Shrewsbury. It was gutted by fire in 1831 and restored to designs by the architect Alfred Waterhouse in 1871 for Albert Brassey. It was a Jesuit college from 1922 until 1969 and a training college for the National Westminster Bank from 1969 until 1999. Brassey rebuilt Heythrop as a model village in the 1870s and 1880s. He encouraged the growth of the church congregation such that it outgrew its Norman building.

In 1880 he had a new Church of England parish church of St. Nicholas built by the Gothic Revival architect Sir Arthur Blomfield. The south doorway incorporates 13th century mouldings from the demolished nave of the old church. Albert Brassey had the rectory built at about the same time. It remained in the Brasseys' ownership, and when the incumbent ceased to reside in the parish in 1923 it was renamed the Dower House and let as a private house. Former UK Prime Minister Theresa May was a pupil at Heythrop Primary School. The Heythrop Zoological Gardens is located near the village.

== Sources and further reading ==
- Crossley, Alan, ed. (1983). "Parishes: Heythrop". A History of the County of Oxford. Victoria County History. Vol. 11: Wootton Hundred (northern part). London: Oxford University Press for the Institute of Historical Research. pp. 131–143. ISBN 978-0-19722-758-9.
- Ekwall, Eilert (1960) [1936]. Concise Oxford Dictionary of English Place-Names (4th ed.). Oxford: Oxford University Press. Heythrop. ISBN 0198691033.
- Rowley, Trevor (1978). Villages in the Landscape. Archaeology in the Field Series. London: J.M. Dent & Sons Ltd. p. 137. ISBN 0-460-04166-5.
- Sherwood, Jennifer; Pevsner, Nikolaus (1974). Oxfordshire. The Buildings of England. Harmondsworth: Penguin Books. pp. 646–649. ISBN 0-14-071045-0.
