= Heythrop Park =

Country house hotel in Heythrop, Oxfordshire, England

Coordinates: 51.9352°N 1.4721°W

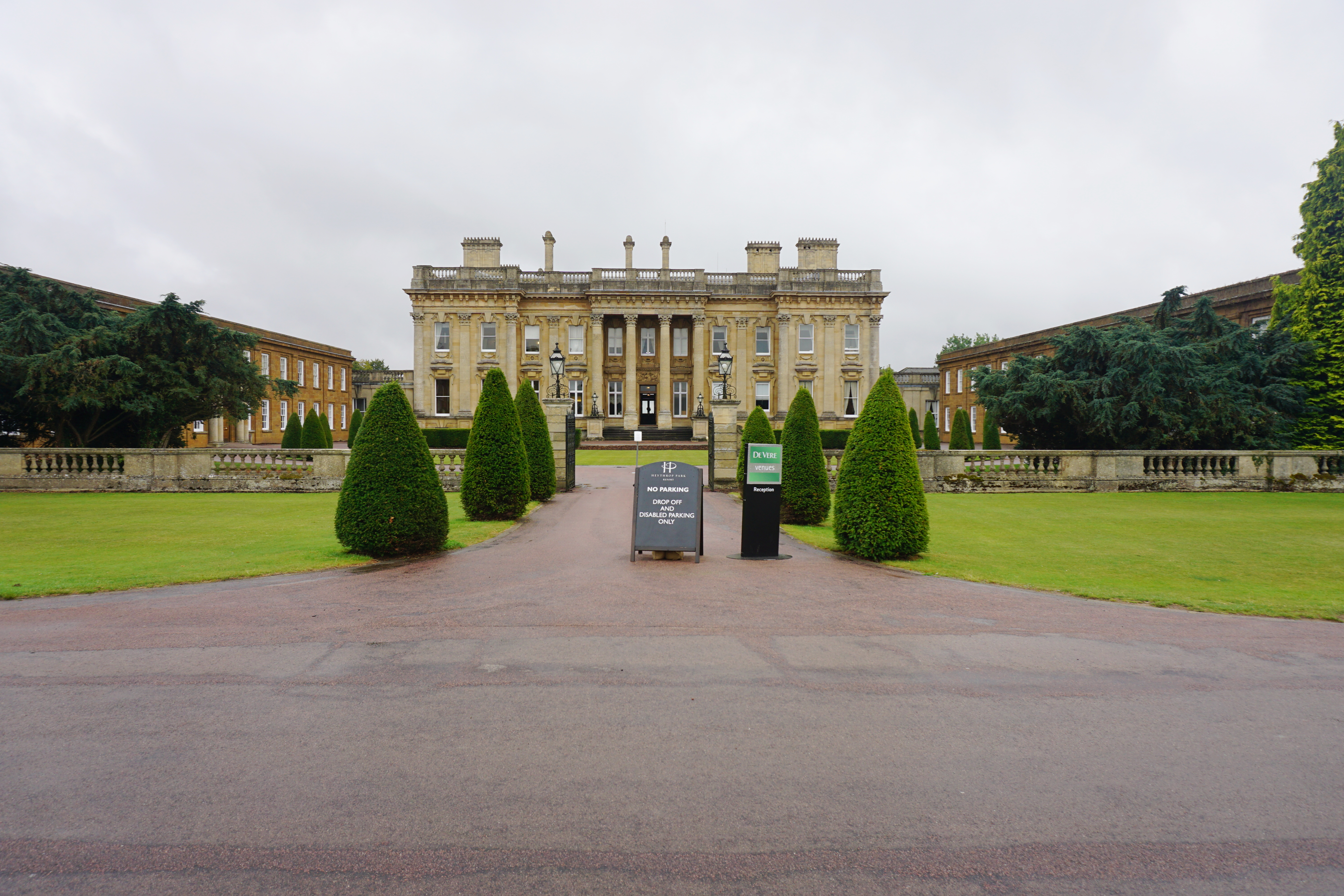
- The entrance front of Heythrop Park

- Location within Oxfordshire
- Type: Country house
- Location: Heythrop, Oxfordshire

History
- Built: 1700s
- Built for: Charles Talbot, 1st Duke of Shrewsbury
- Original use: Private home

Site notes
- Architect: Thomas Archer
- Architectural style: Baroque
- Current use: Hotel

National Register of Historic Parks and Gardens
- Official name: Heythrop Park
- Designated: 31 May 1984
- Reference no.: 1000489

Listed Building – Grade II*
- Official name: National Westminster Bank Staff College – Main House
- Designated: 27 August 1957
- Reference no.: 1052781

Listed Building – Grade II
- Official name: National Westminster Bank Staff College - Shrewsbury and Archer Wings, Balustrading, Walls, Steps, Gates, Gatepiers
- Designated: 27 August 1957
- Reference no.: 1052782

Heythrop Park is a Grade II* listed early 18th-century country house 1 mile (1.6 km) southeast of Heythrop in Oxfordshire. It was designed by the architect Thomas Archer in the Baroque style for Charles Talbot, 1st Duke of Shrewsbury. A fire in 1831 destroyed the original interior. From 1922 until 1970 Heythrop housed first a Jesuit tertiary education college, and later a training establishment. The house is now the main building of the Heythrop Park Hotel, Golf & Country Club.

== Architecture ==
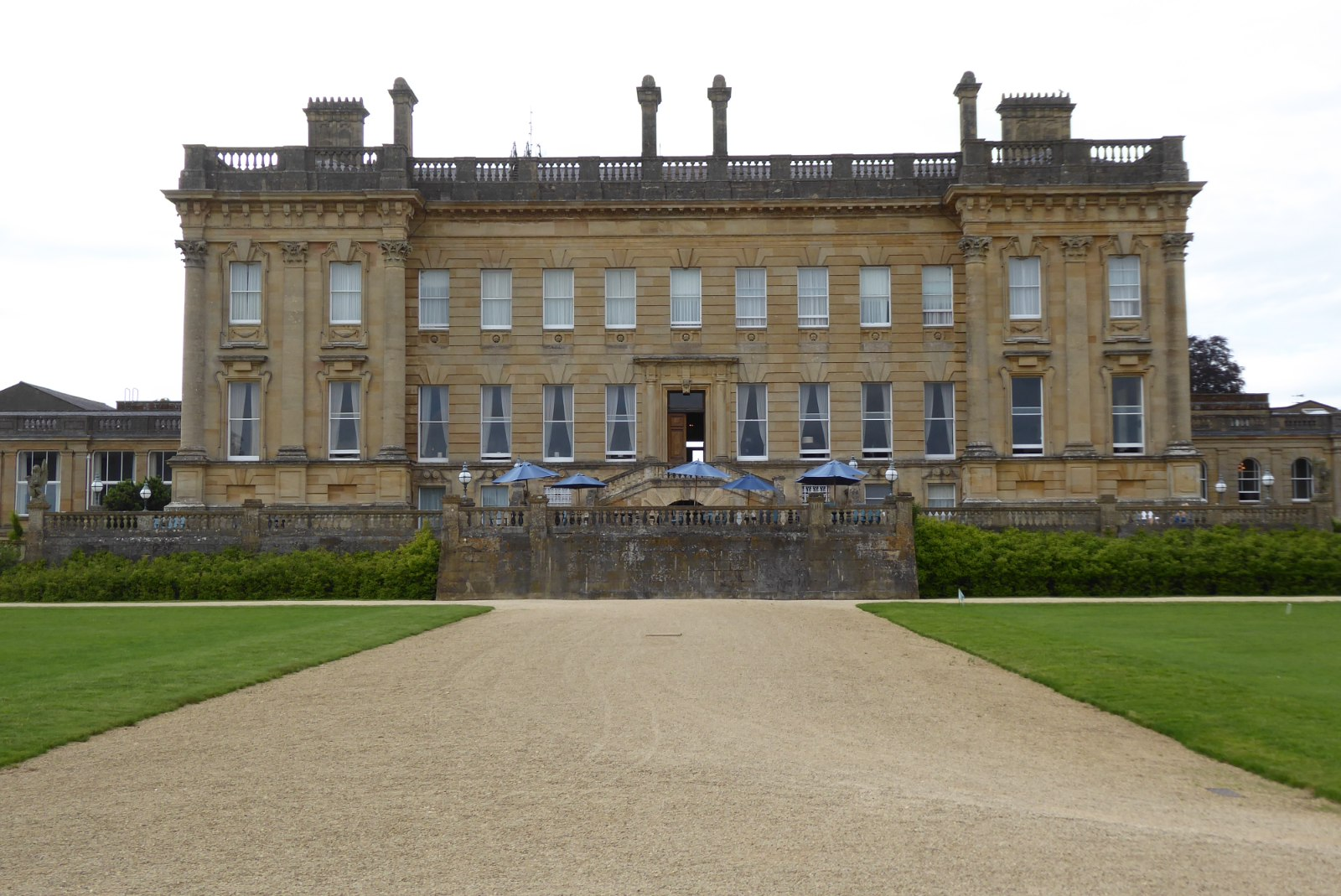
Garden front

Heythrop Park was designed by the architect Thomas Archer for Charles Talbot, 1st Duke of Shrewsbury. Shrewsbury had travelled in Italy on an extensive Grand Tour, between 1700 and 1705. Apparently the duke had already decided to build in 1700, before he left for Italy, because of his failure to buy Cornbury Park near Charlbury, Oxfordshire. Cornbury was a regular classical house designed by Inigo Jones' mason, Nicholas Stone, which had been brought up to date for the Earl of Clarendon more recently by Hugh May; Shrewsbury's disappointment evinces the enthusiasm for classical architecture that he had acquired before he left England. Modern architecture in Italy had evolved into its Baroque form, a style quite unknown in England. The travelling duke was quickly won over: in Rome, Shrewsbury visited the villa of Domenico de' Rossi in 1702, to "lay aside some prints" by the architectural engraver of the Studio di architettura civile di Roma, full of designs by Borromini and Bernini. In 1704 Shrewsbury obtained a plan for a house from Paolo Falconieri. On his return to England, apparently possessing at least Rossi's first volume (of 1702), Shrewsbury called upon Archer to create a modern Italian palazzo set in the Oxfordshire countryside. At this time, Archer was one of the few English architects to have studied in Italy and become conversant with the Baroque forms of architecture, but many of the details of Heythrop were adapted from Roman precedents through engravings in Rossi's publication, though none was directly imitated.

Work on the house began in 1706. By 1709 the roof was in place and by 1713 the house was ready for partial occupation, but John Vanbrugh noted in April 1716 that it was incomplete, and so it was still, on Shrewsbury's death in 1718. The building contractors were William and Francis Smith of Warwick. The stone used is a Middle Jurassic freestone, apparently Chipping Norton Limestone from local quarries.

Archer's design was, as requested, in the Italian Baroque style. On the entrance facade of eleven bays, the giant order with a level balustraded roof is very similar to the design which William Talman had executed for the Duke of Devonshire at Chatsworth House just few years earlier. Archer's Corinthian order shifts restlessly against the wall plane, varying on the entrance front from flat pilasters to attached columns, to a free-standing screen that marches across the recessed entrance bays. The wall plane is ashlar on the entrance front but with strictly conventionalized channeled rustication the full height of the garden front. On the side elevations, the channeled rustication appears only on the rusticated pilaster-like corner quoins of the lightly projecting five central bays. In the frieze under the main cornice, occasional discreet square openings give light to the low attics.

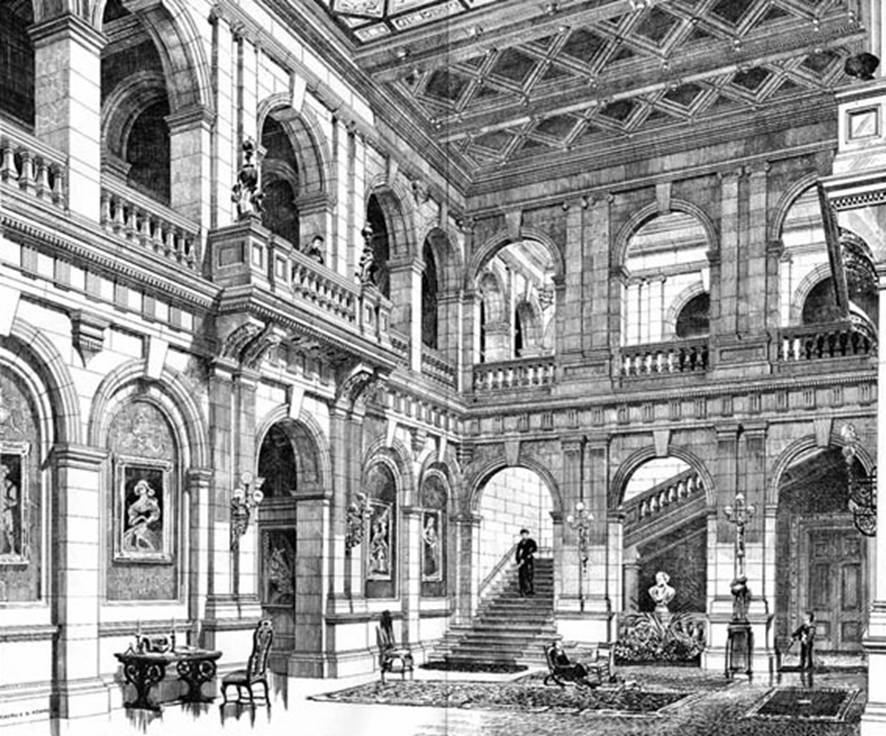
Alfred Waterhouse's hall at Heythrop Park; described by Pevsner, as in the style of Vanbrugh, can be compared to Vanbrugh's hall at Grimsthorpe Castle. The theme is that of the courtyard of a Renaissance palazzo. Paxton designed a similar courtyard hall with a glazed roof at Mentmore Towers twenty years earlier.

The inspiration for the Baroque facade at Heythrop was Gian Lorenzo Bernini's final design for the Louvre, a plan never executed. Like Chatsworth, Heythrop Park comprises two floors linked by the giant order standing upon a raised semi-basement; the bays are articulated by a giant order with the Baroque inturned Corinthian volutes invented by Francesco Borromini. The elevation is broken by three projections, the centre being the central portico with Corinthian columns; this has no pediment to break the roof-line. In a break from his usual style, Archer has given the fenestration unusual emphasis by contrasting architectural detailing: the windows on the ground floor are from a design by Bernini, while those on the floor above are in a mannerist style with overlarge keystones penetrating the cornice, as at Talman's Chatsworth. The central nine bays of the 13-bay garden front carry the rustication of the half-basement right up the wall to the cornice, with perfectly plain window openings and a central door framed in a very sober Doric order; this severe front is relieved by its richly treated two-bay end pavilions, which take up all the rich motifs of the entrance front.

In 1831 a fire swept through the house destroying the interiors, many designed by James Gibbs, including a quatrefoil hall, a feature believed to have been unique in England. Other features of the rooms included a saloon which had an entablature supported by life-sized statues of Ceres and Flora beneath a stuccoed ceiling depicting the four corners of the globe. Mrs. Philip Lybbe Powys, who visited Heythrop in 1778 remarked that the stucco work was by "the famous Roberts of Oxford", though the plasterer Thomas Roberts was born in 1711; "In the arches over the doorways", Mrs. Lybbe Powys noted "fables of Aesop, finely executed in stucco, with wreathes of vine leaves."

After the fire the house remained derelict until sold to the railway contractor Thomas Brassey in 1870 as a wedding present for his third son Albert Brassey (1840–1918). Brassey commissioned the eminent architect Alfred Waterhouse to rebuild the interior. Waterhouse, a noted Gothic Revival architect, in deference to the history of the house worked in a neo-classical style; his double-height arcaded hall, being more redolent of the Baroque of John Vanbrugh than Archer. However, Waterhouse did add Gothic motifs to the hall's clerestory in the form of stained glass windows, by Morris and Co, depicting Faith, Hope and Charity.

== History ==
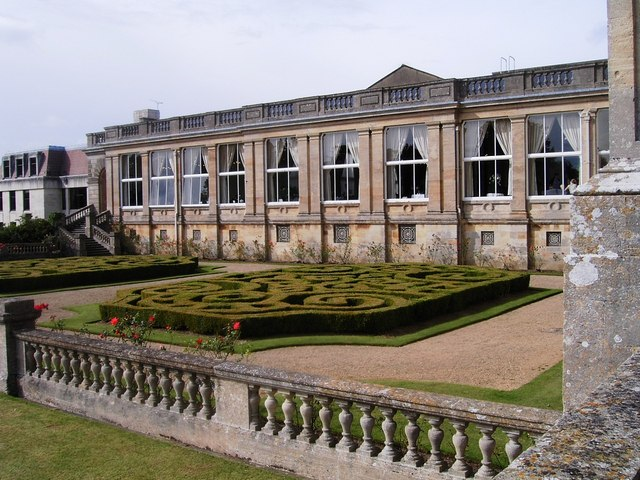
Heythrop Park. The twentieth century saw the house extended for institutional use. Some contrasting architectural styles were employed.

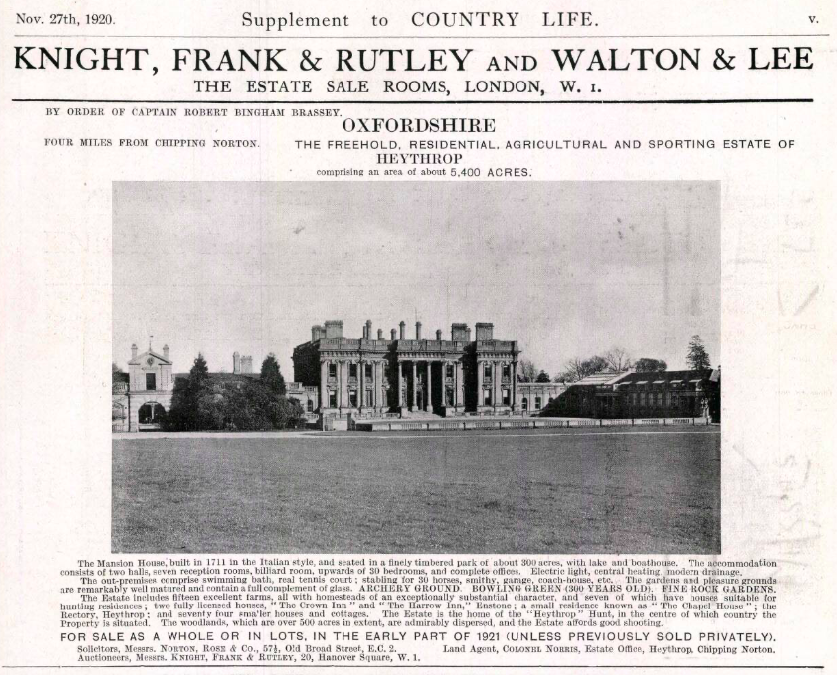
Sale advert from Country Life Saturday 27 November 1920

Heythrop Hall passed through various generations of the Talbot family. By 1831 it was owned by the Earl of Shrewsbury but occupied by the Duke of Beaufort during the hunting season. It was rendered uninhabitable by a fire on 24 February 1831.

It was purchased in 1870 by the railway contractor Thomas Brassey for £113,200 (equivalent to £11,650,000 in 2025) when it comprised 3,500 acres. On his death in 1871 his fourth son, Albert Brassey, became the new owner and embarked on a programme of rebuilding. The house was put up for sale in 1920 but did not sell until 1922 when it was purchased by Mr. Parlour.

From 1923 to 1926 two wings were added to the north front built of Hornton ironstone from north Oxfordshire. Like Chipping Norton Limestone it is a Middle Jurassic limestone, but its higher ironstone makes it much darker and browner than the stone used to build the house in the 18th century. In 1926 Heythrop Hall opened as a college for the philosophical and theological studies of Jesuit scholastics. During this period the house was altered and enlarged, not always in a style sympathetic to the original architectural concept.

In 1952, the indoor real tennis court was converted to a chapel and in 1965, a library was added. In 1960, the architectural firm of Howell, Killick and Amis created two halls of residence in the grounds in a contemporary style.

When in 1970 the Jesuit college moved to London as part of the University there, the National Westminster Bank group bought Heythrop Park and turned the house and its precincts into a training and conference centre. In 1999 NatWest sold the house to Firoz Kassam's company Firoka Ltd, which has turned the house and grounds to a hotel and country club.

== Heythrop Park Hotel Golf & Country Club ==
Heythrop Park Hotel Golf & Country Club is a hotel with conference facilities and a golf course. In 2018 Bourne Leisure purchased the site, reopening Heythrop Park as a hotel in their Warner Leisure Hotels chain in 2022.

== See also ==
- List of Jesuit sites

== Sources ==
- Arkell, W. J. (1948). "The building-stones of Blenheim Palace, Cornbury Park, Glympton Park and Heythrop House, Oxfordshire" (PDF). Oxoniensia. XIII. Oxford Architectural and Historical Society: 49–54. ISSN 0308-5562.
- Beard, Geoffrey (1975). Decorative Plasterwork in Great Britain.
- Colvin, Howard (1995). A Biographical Dictionary of British Architects 1600–1840 (3rd ed.).
- Crossley, Alan; Baggs, A. P.; Colvin, Christina; Colvin, H. M.; Cooper, Janet; Day, C. J.; Selwyn, Nesta; Tomkinson, A., eds. (1983). "Parishes: Heythrop". A History of the County of Oxford. Victoria County History. Vol. 11: Wootton Hundred (northern part). pp. 131–143. ISBN 978-0-19722-758-9.
- Gomme, Andor (1992). "Smith and Rossi". Architectural History. 35: 183–191. doi:10.2307/1568575. JSTOR 1568575. S2CID 195057765.
- Pitman, Joanna (7 September 1996). "A lavish Archer plot in the country with the mystery of a whale skeleton; Hidden Assets". The Times. p. 29.
- Sherwood, Jennifer; Pevsner, Nikolaus (1974). Oxfordshire. The Buildings of England. Harmondsworth: Penguin Books. pp. 647–649. ISBN 0-14-071045-0.
- Whiffen, Marcus (1973). Thomas Archer, Architect of the English Baroque (2nd ed.). Los Angeles, Hennessey & Ingalls. p. 22. ISBN 9780912158235.
