= Enstone =

Village and civil parish in Oxfordshire, England

Coordinates: 51.918°N 1.454°W

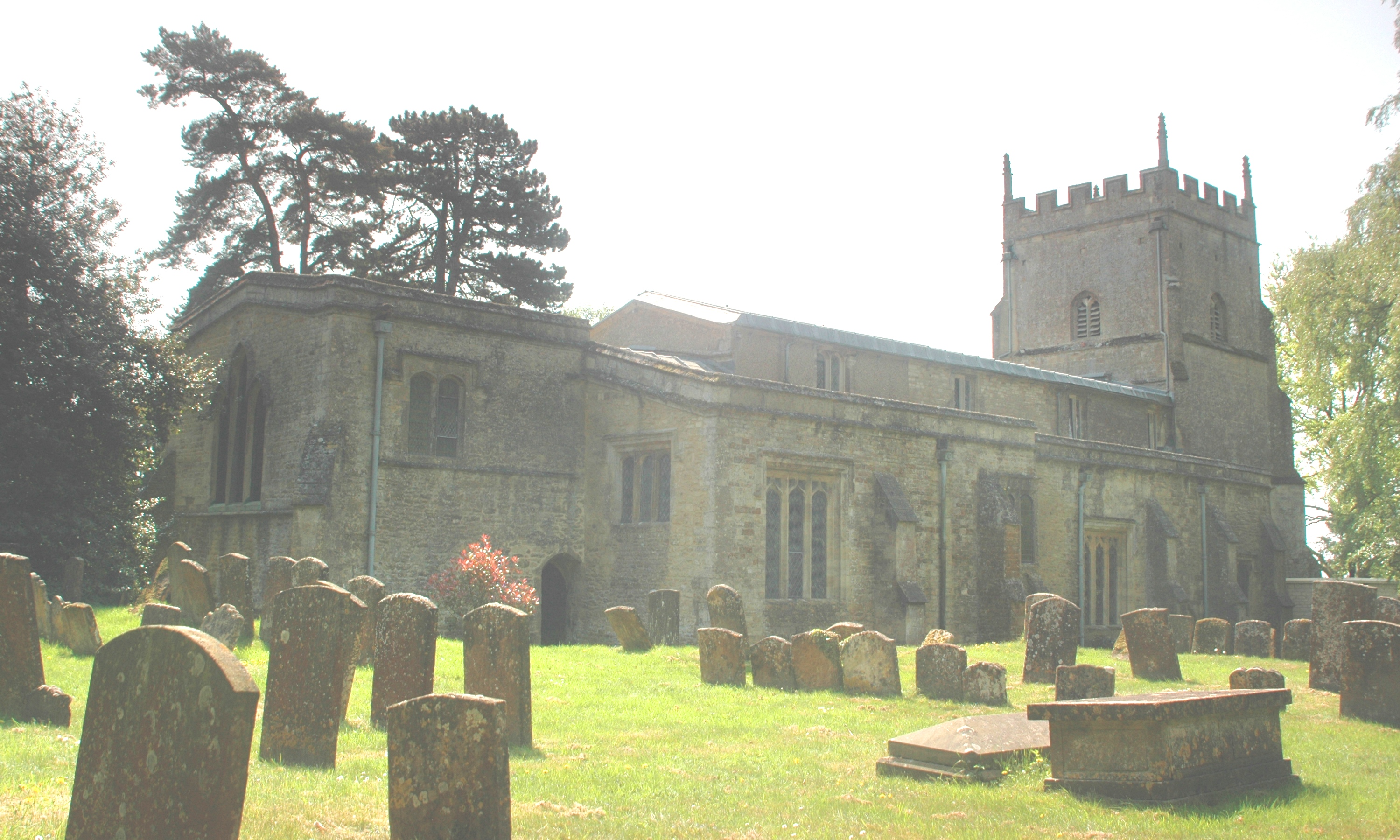
- St Kenelm's parish church, Church Enstone

- Location within Oxfordshire
- Population: 1,139 (parish, including Chalford, Cleveley, Fulwell, Gagingwell, Lidstone, and Radford) (2011 Census)
- OS grid reference: SP3724
- Civil parish: Enstone
- District: West Oxfordshire
- Shire county: Oxfordshire
- Region: South East
- Country: England
- Sovereign state: United Kingdom
- Post town: Chipping Norton
- Postcode district: OX7
- Dialling code: 01608
- Police: Thames Valley
- Fire: Oxfordshire
- Ambulance: South Central
- UK Parliament: Banbury
- Website: Enstone Parish Council

Enstone is a village and civil parish in England, about 4 miles (6.4 km) east of Chipping Norton and 15 miles (24 km) north-west of Oxford city. The civil parish, one of Oxfordshire's largest, consists of the villages of Church Enstone and Neat Enstone, with the hamlets of Chalford, Cleveley, Fulwell, Gagingwell, Lidstone and Radford. The 2011 Census put the parish population as 1,139 living in 453 households. It was estimated at 1,256 in 2019.

== Toponym ==
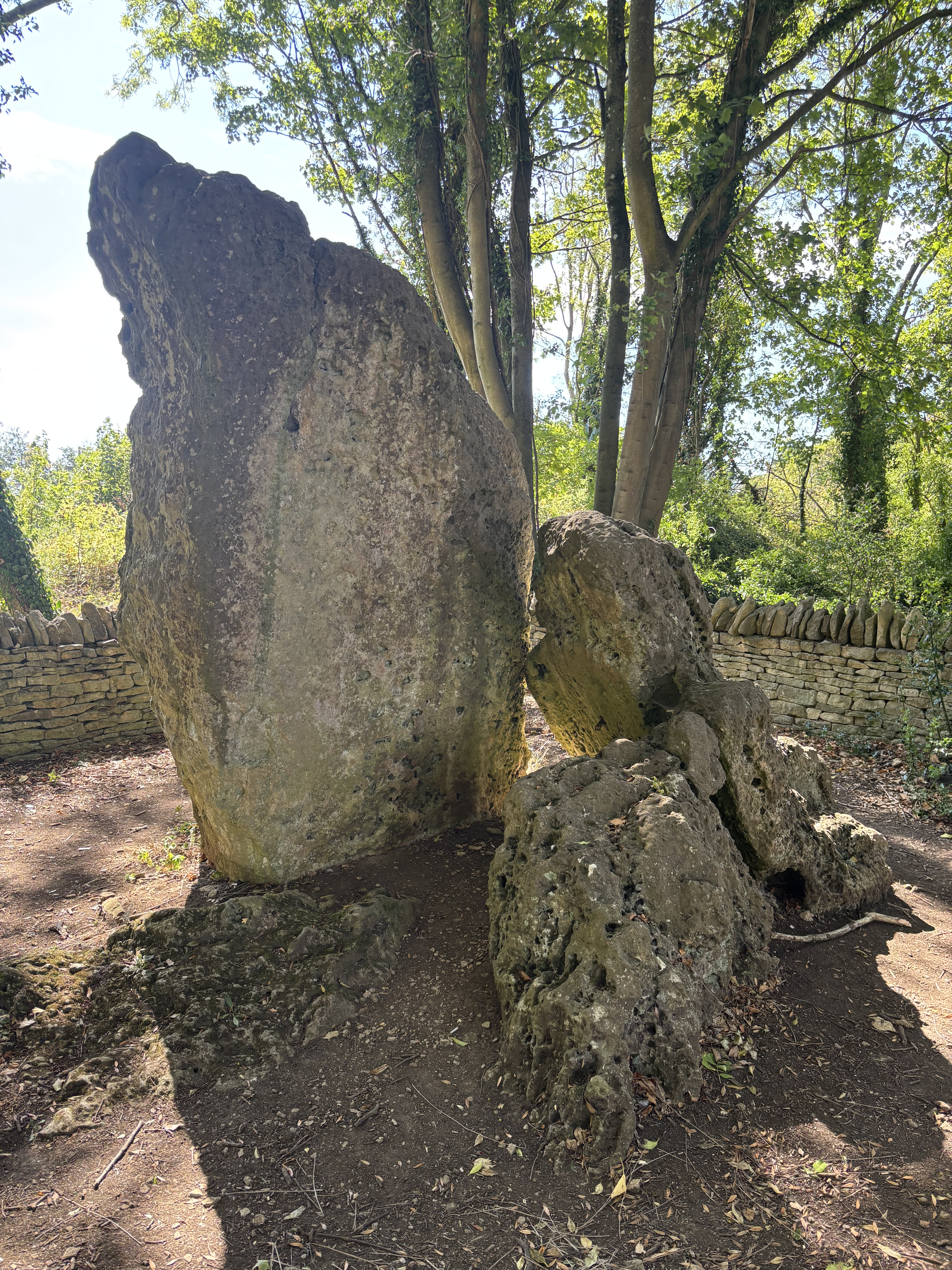
The Hoar Stone or Ent Stone

Enstone takes its name from a standing stone called the Ent Stone, part of the ruins of a Neolithic tomb just off Charlbury Road. The feature, also known as the Hoar Stone, is a scheduled monument.

== Places of worship ==
=== Church of England ===
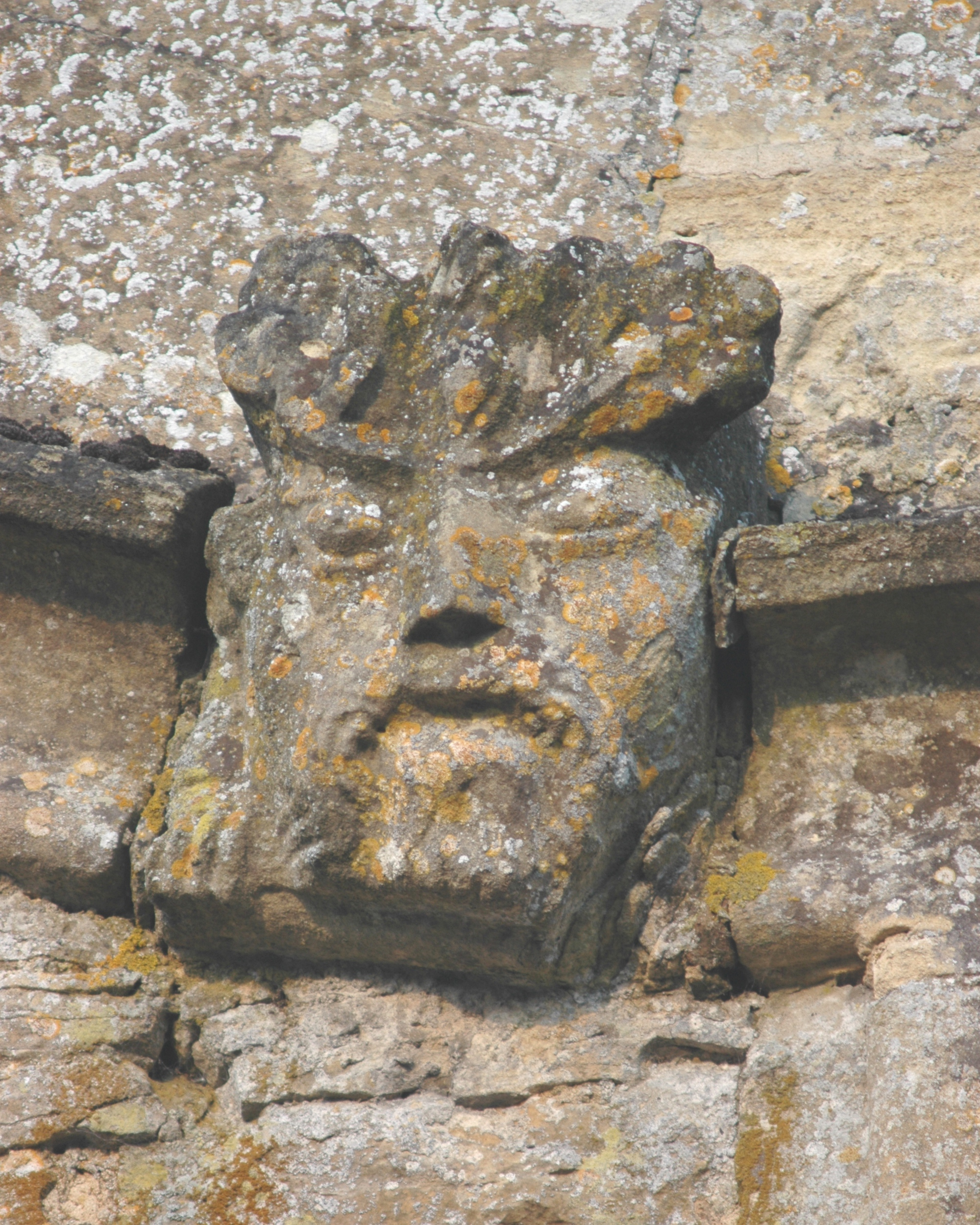
Grotesque on the exterior of St Kenelm's parish church

The earliest parts of the Church of England parish church of St Kenelm are Norman, but it has been rebuilt in stages since the 12th century. The south aisle with a four-bay arcade dates from about 1180. The north aisle was added late in the 13th century. It has an arcade that alternates round and octagonal piers. At about the same time, a new chancel arch was placed in the east wall of the old chancel and the present chancel added east of the previous one. The two-storey south porch was added late in the 13th century. It has octopartite rib vaulting springing from head corbels.

In about 1450, the south aisle was widened, wide arches being opened on both sides of the former chancel and both aisles extended eastwards to form side chapels beside the new arches. Most of the present windows in the north aisle were added in the 15th or early 16th centuries. Early in the 16th century, a chantry chapel with a rib-vaulted ceiling was added on the south side of the later chancel and a wide arch built to link it with the chancel. Little of the chapel remains except the corbels of the vaulting. The bell tower was built in the mid-16th century. The side windows of the chancel are also Tudor.

In 1856, St Kenelm's was restored under the direction of the Oxford Diocesan architect George Edmund Street, and the lych gate and west doorway were added. In about 1870, the present east window of the chancel was inserted, along with a window on the corner between the chancel and the north-east chapel. A stained-glass window installed in the north aisle as a First World War memorial may have been done by Morris & Co. St Kenelm's is a Grade II* listed building. The tower has a ring of six bells. W. and J. Taylor of Loughborough, Leicestershire, cast the treble, second, third, and fifth bells in 1831, presumably at the foundry they had at Oxford at that time. John Taylor & Co cast the fourth and tenor bells at their Loughborough foundry in 1961 and 1981 respectively.

East of St Kenelm's church is a medieval tithe barn built for Winchcombe Abbey, a Benedictine monastery in Gloucestershire that owned the manor of Enstone. The barn has a cruck roof and a date stone of 1382, but its construction manner suggests it is from the late 15th century. It may therefore have been rebuilt at that time, retaining the date stone from an earlier structure. The tithe barn is a scheduled Grade II* listed building. In 1657, an attempt to merge the Benefices of Enstone and Heythrop failed in the face of local opposition. They were finally merged in 1964. In 2001, the Enstone and Heythrop benefice merged with that of Ascott-under-Wychwood, Chadlington, and Spelsbury to form the Chase Benefice. The vicar in the 1960s was Hubert Brasier (1917–1981), father of the UK Prime Minister Theresa May.

=== Other denominations ===
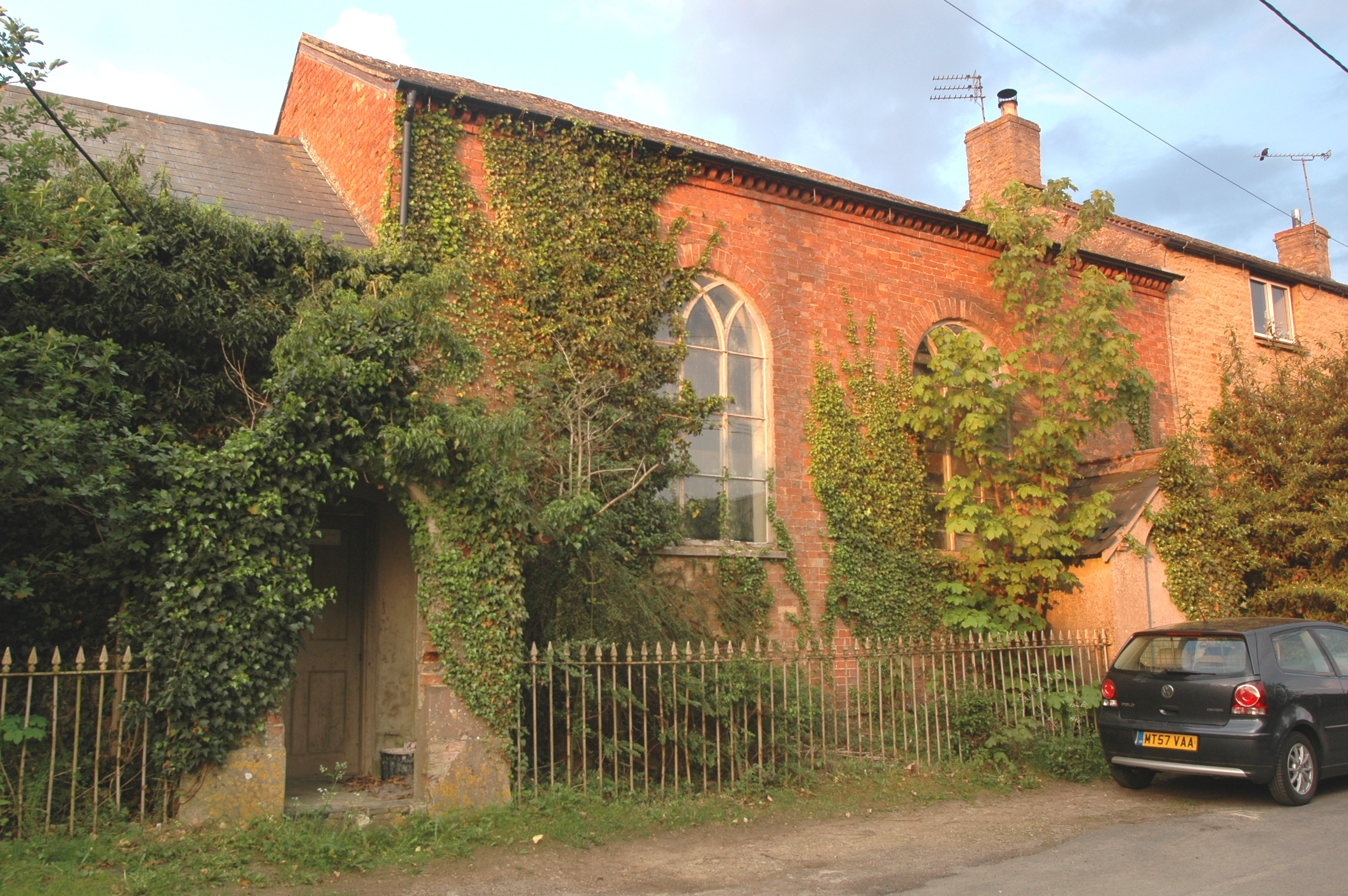
Former nonconformist chapel in Neat Enstone

The Wesleyan chapel in Chapel Lane, Neat Enstone, is no longer used for worship. According to John Marius Wilson's Imperial Gazetteer of England and Wales (1870–1872), there were also Baptist and Roman Catholic congregations in the village at that time.

== Amenities ==
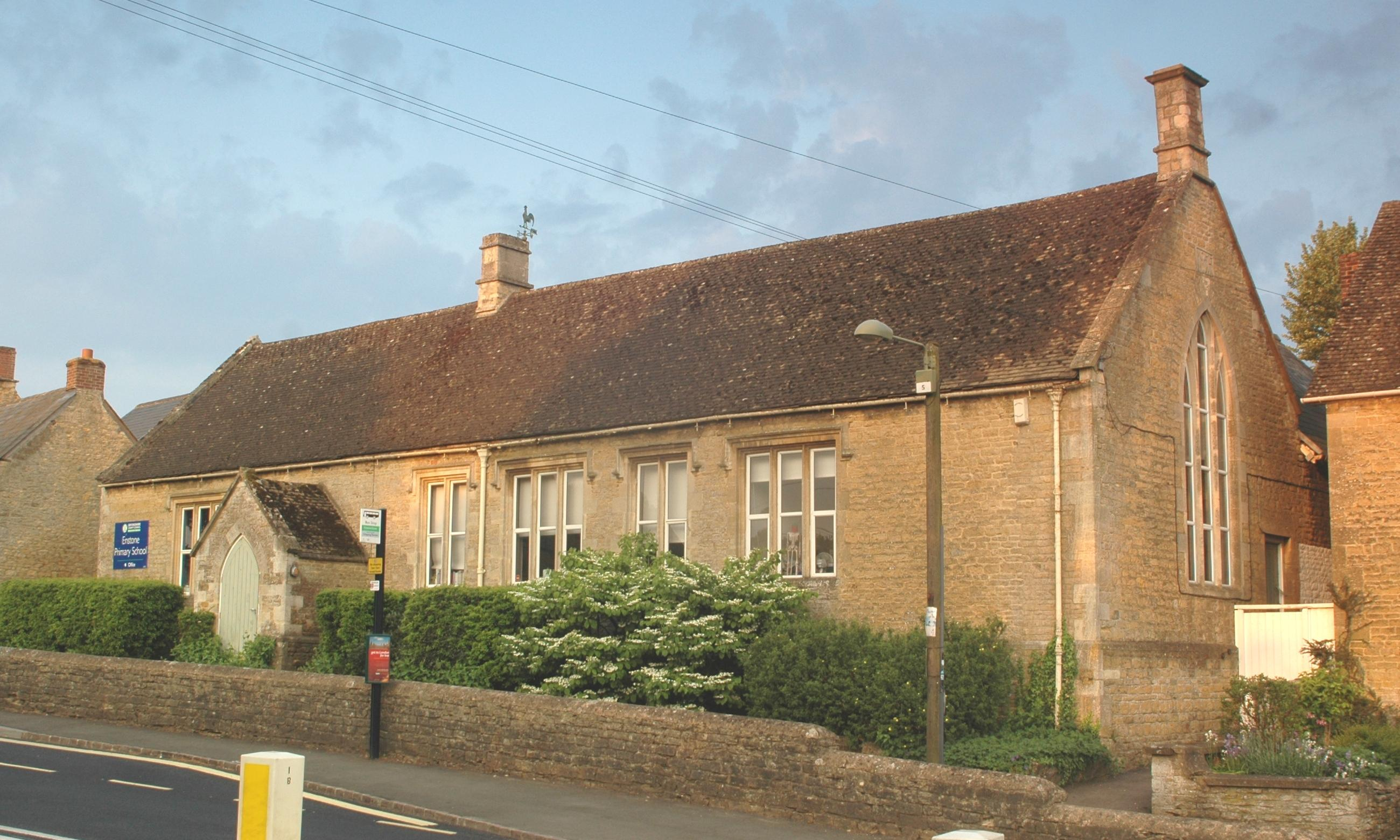
Enstone Primary School, Neat Enstone

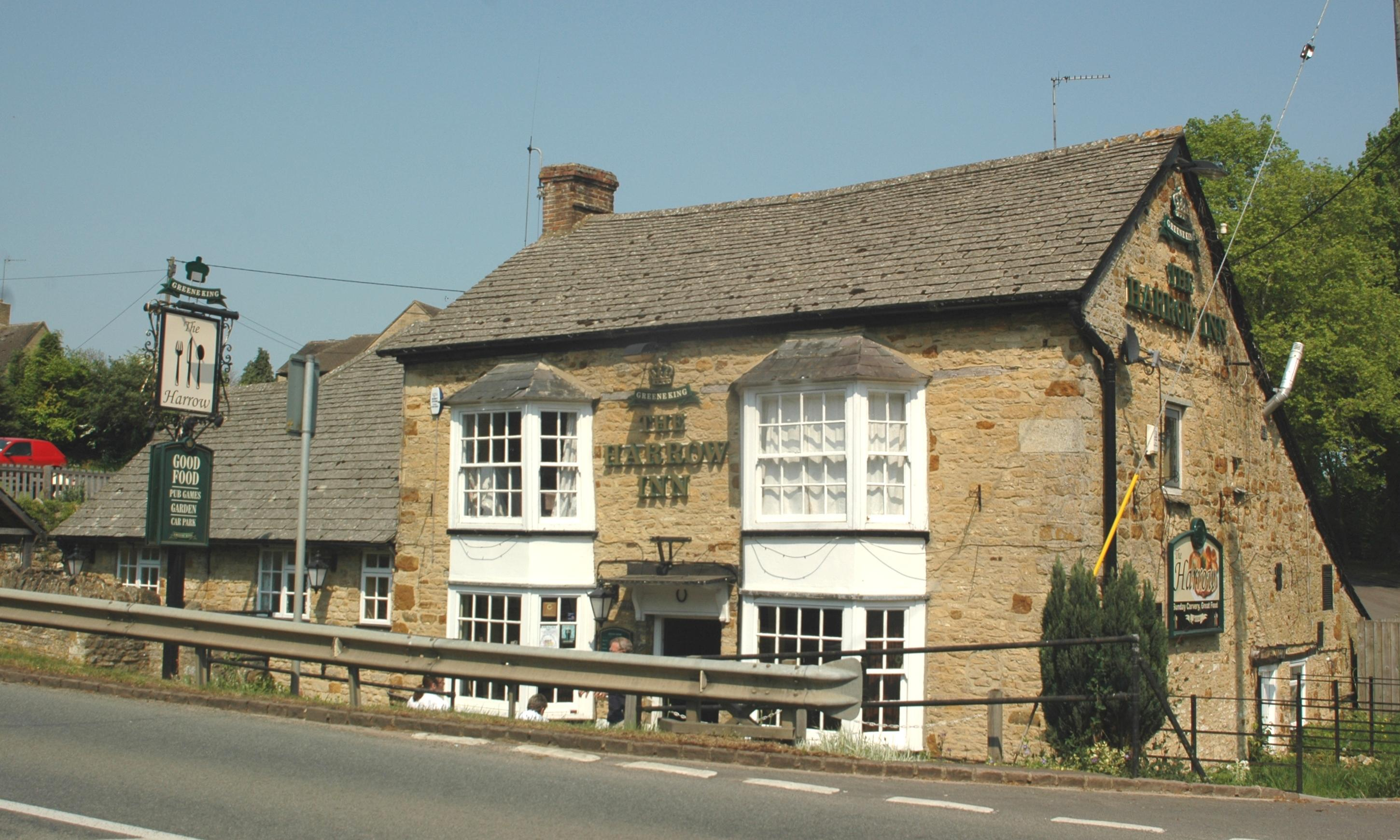
The Artyard Cafe/Pub, Neat Enstone

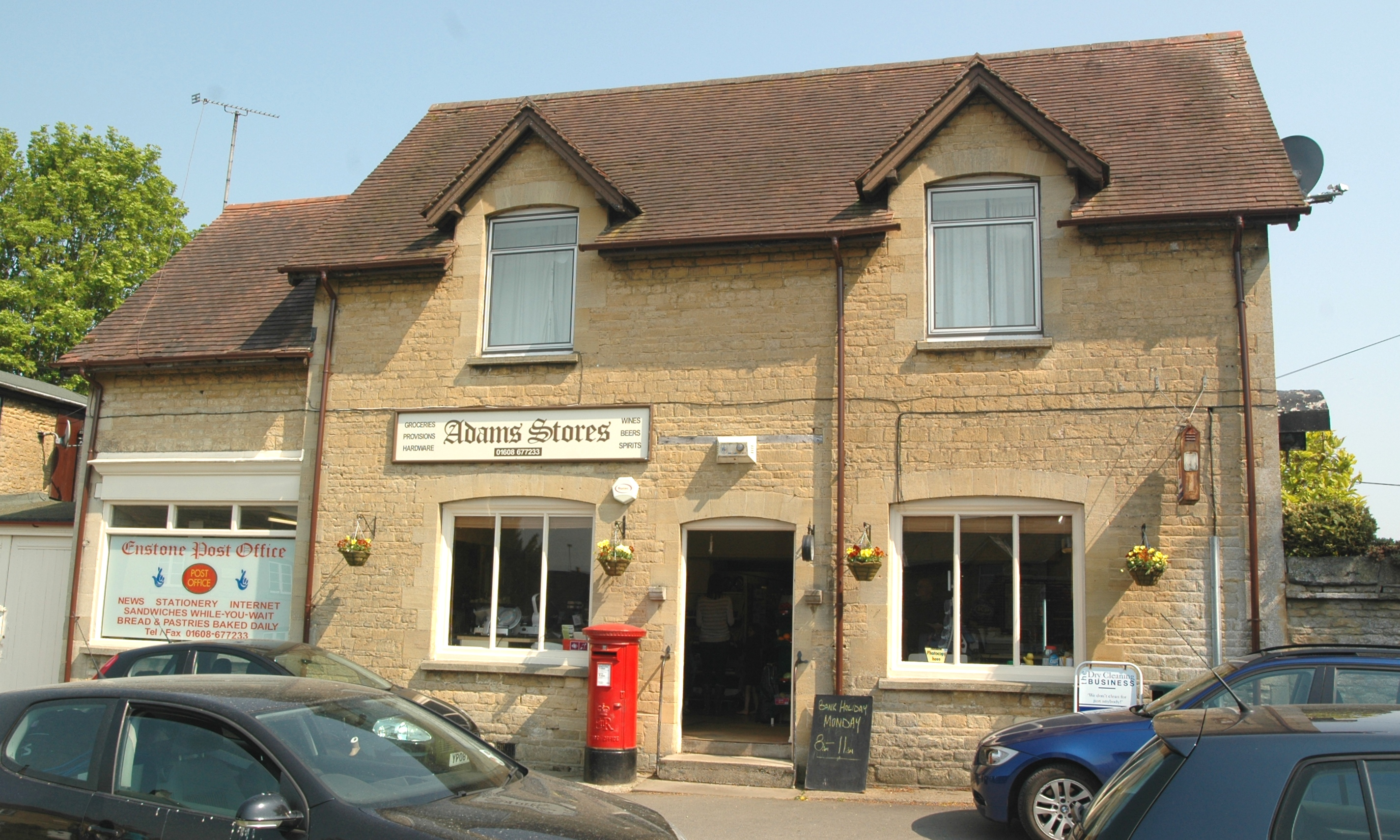
Post Office and village store, Neat Enstone

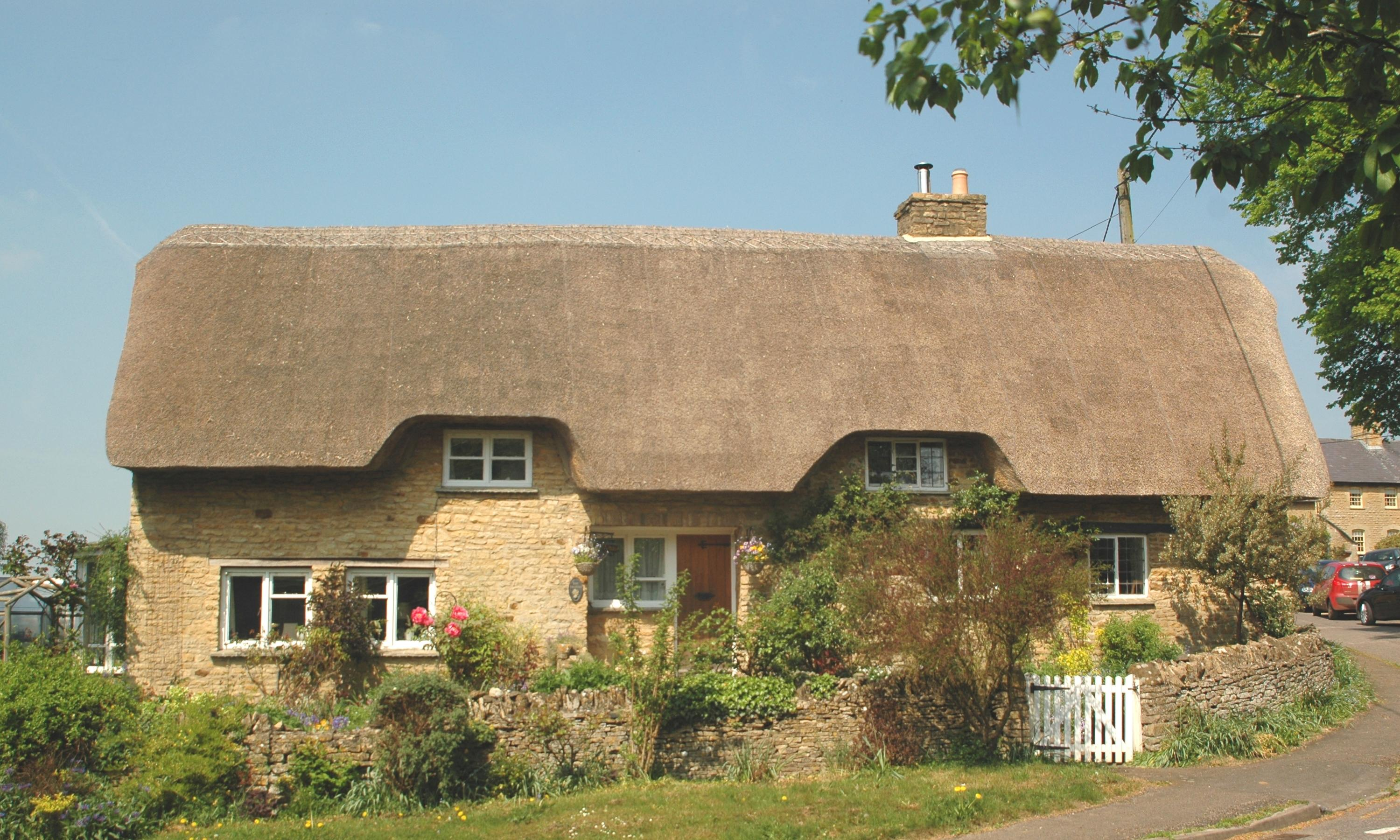
The Thatch, Church Enstone

The primary school in Neat Enstone dates back to 1875. The latest Ofsted report is positive. Enstone has two public houses: the Crown Inn in Mill Lane at Church Enstone, built late in the 17th century and extended in the 20th, and the Artyard Cafe/Pub (previously the Harrow Inn) on the A44 main road at Neat Enstone. Also in Neat Enstone are shops, including a post office and general store and an art gallery, and a retirement home. There is a filling station with a shop and coach-hire services on the main A44 on the south side of the village towards Woodstock. Enstone has a Women's Institute.

Enstone Sports Football Club plays at Step 7 level. Enstone is at the junction of two long-established main roads, one between Oxford and Chipping Norton and the other between Enstone and Bicester. Both were once turnpikes: the Act of Parliament for the latter was passed in 1797. Since the 1920s, the Oxford–Chipping Norton road has been numbered the A44 and the Enstone–Bicester Road the B4030.

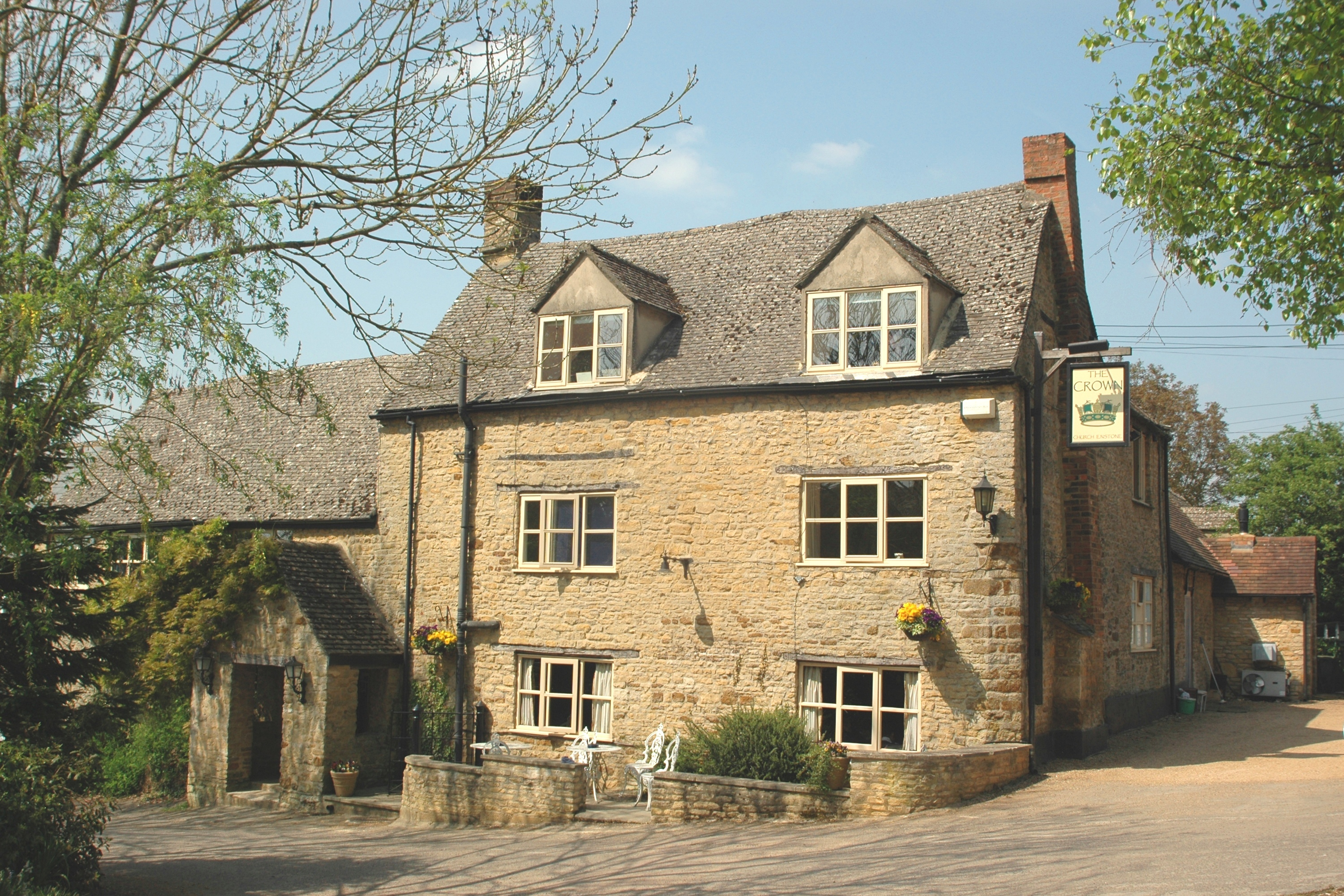
The Crown Inn, Church Enstone

== RAF Enstone ==
RAF Enstone, north-east of Church Enstone, was a Bomber Command Operational Training Unit (OTU) in the Second World War. It was decommissioned in 1947, and is now the civilian Enstone Aerodrome. The site of the former RAF buildings has been redeveloped as an industrial estate and the north-western perimeter of the airfield turned into a poultry farm.

== In popular culture ==
Enstone in bygone times is described in Lifting the Latch, a biography of the farm labourer Mont Abbott, by Sheila Stewart.

== Formula One team ==
South-east of Enstone Aerodrome is a disused quarry, now the site of the Whiteways Technical Centre, where the Formula One motor racing Alpine F1 Team is based. The F1 team, then named Benetton Formula, moved from Witney to Enstone in 1992. Renault purchased the team in 2000 and in 2002 renamed it as the Renault F1 Team. At the end of 2009, Genii Capital acquired a majority stake in the team with the involvement of Lotus Cars. It was renamed first Lotus Renault GP and then the Lotus F1 Team. In 2015, Renault re-acquired the team and named it the Renault Sport F1 Team. The firm announced in 2020 that the team would be renamed again as the Alpine F1 Team from the 2021 season, after its sports-car marque of the same name, winning the 2021 Hungarian Grand Prix with Esteban Ocon.

Drivers with the team have won the drivers' championship four times: Michael Schumacher in 1994 and 1995, and Fernando Alonso in 2005 and 2006. The team has won the constructors' championship three times: as Benetton in 1995, and as Renault in 2005 and 2006. The team's car for the 2012 season was named the Lotus E20, E20 being a tribute to the team members and their 20-year history and achievements at the Enstone facility.

== The Enstone Marvels ==
Thomas Bushell (c. 1593 – 1674) was a servant of Francis Bacon who went on to become a mining engineer and defender of Lundy Island for the Royalist cause during the Civil War. Bushell came to live in Oxfordshire, where he had an estate at Road Enstone. There he found a spring and rock formation which he turned into an attraction as a grotto, and eventually a collection of water-powered special effects ('giochi d’aqua') which became known as 'Bushell's Wells' or the ‘Enstone Marvels’. There is a detailed description in Robert Plot’s Natural History of Oxfordshire (1677), including some engraved illustrations. They were demolished in 1836.

In the 1630s Charles I paid Bushell an unexpected visit there. On a subsequent royal visit (on 23 August, 1636), the rock was presented to Queen Henrietta Maria in a kind of masque with music by Henry Lawes, for which Bushell himself provided some verse. A fictionalised account of the masque is included in the historical novel Wife to Mr Milton (1942) by Robert Graves. In 1635 Bushell was granted a soap monopoly; in January 1637 he had the grant of the royal mines in Wales.

== Sources ==
- Crossley, Alan (ed.); Baggs, A.P.; Colvin, Christina; Colvin, H.M.; Cooper, Janet; Day, C.J.; Selwyn, Nesta; Tomkinson, A. (1983). "Heythrop". A History of the County of Oxford. Victoria County History. Vol. 11: Wootton Hundred (northern part). pp. 131–143.
- Emery, Frank (1974). The Oxfordshire Landscape. The Making of the English Landscape. London: Hodder & Stoughton. pp. 31, 32, 144, 145. ISBN 0-340-04301-6.
- Jordan, John (1857). A Parochial History of Enstone, in the County of Oxford: Being an Attempt to Exemplify the Compilation of Parochial Histories.
- Lattey, R.T. (1952–53). "Field Names of Enstone and Little Tew Parishes, Oxon". Oxoniensia. XVII–XVIII. Oxford: Oxford Architectural and Historical Society: 265–266.
- Lattey, R.T. (1956). "Field Names of Enstone and Little Tew Parishes, Oxon". Oxoniensia. XXI. Oxford: Oxford Architectural and Historical Society: 84.
- Sherwood, Jennifer; Pevsner, Nikolaus (1974). Oxfordshire. The Buildings of England. Harmondsworth: Penguin Books. pp. 593–595. ISBN 0-14-071045-0.
- Stewart, Sheila (1988). Lifting The Latch: A Life on the Land – Based on the Life of Mont Abbott of Enstone, Oxfordshire. Day Books. ISBN 978-0-9532213-3-2.
- Wood-Jones, Raymond B. (1956). "The Rectorial Barn at Church Enstone". Oxoniensia. XXI. Oxford: Oxford Architectural and Historical Society: 43–48.
