= River Glyme =

River in Oxfordshire, England

Coordinates: 51°49′56″N 1°21′15″W

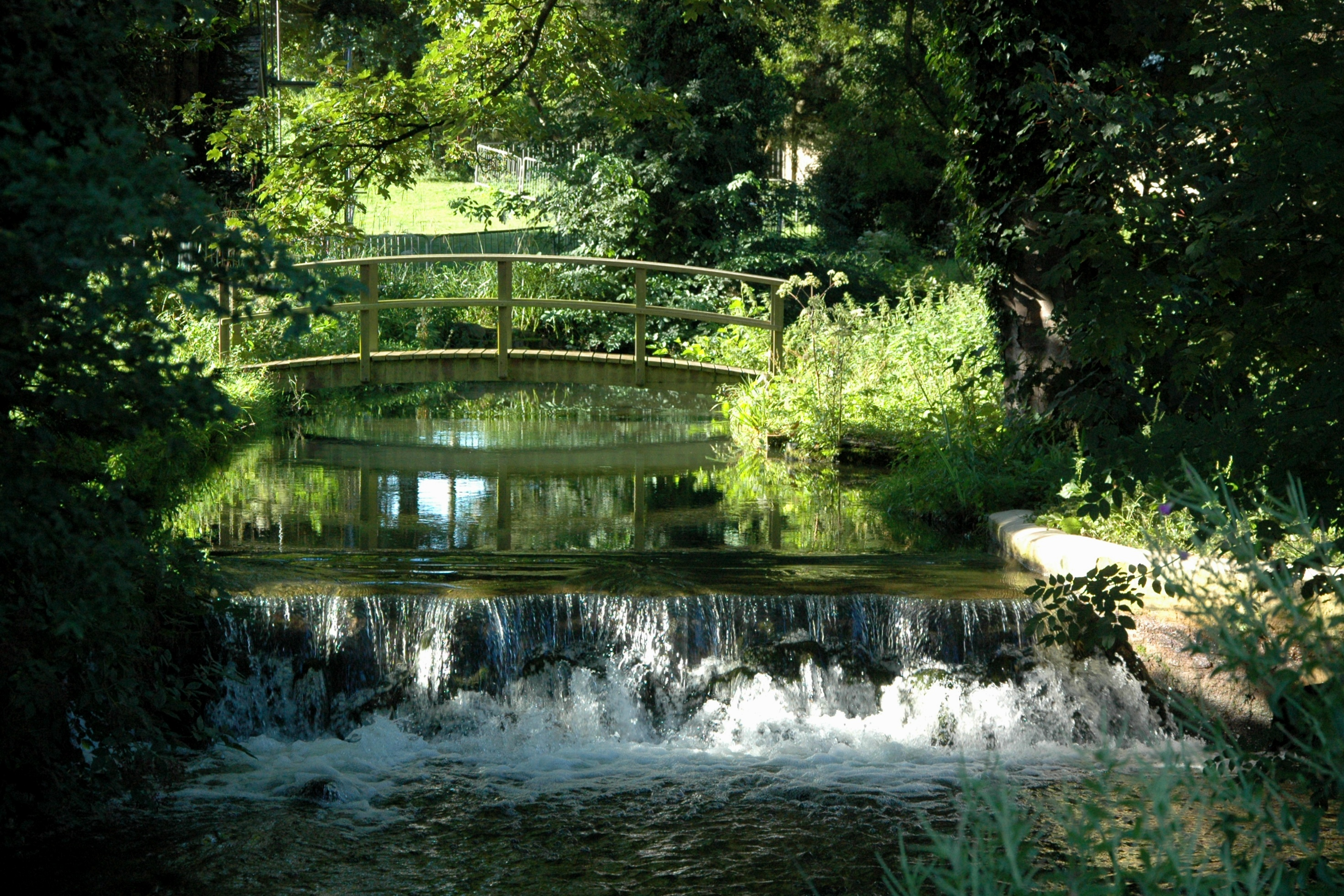
The River Glyme at Glympton

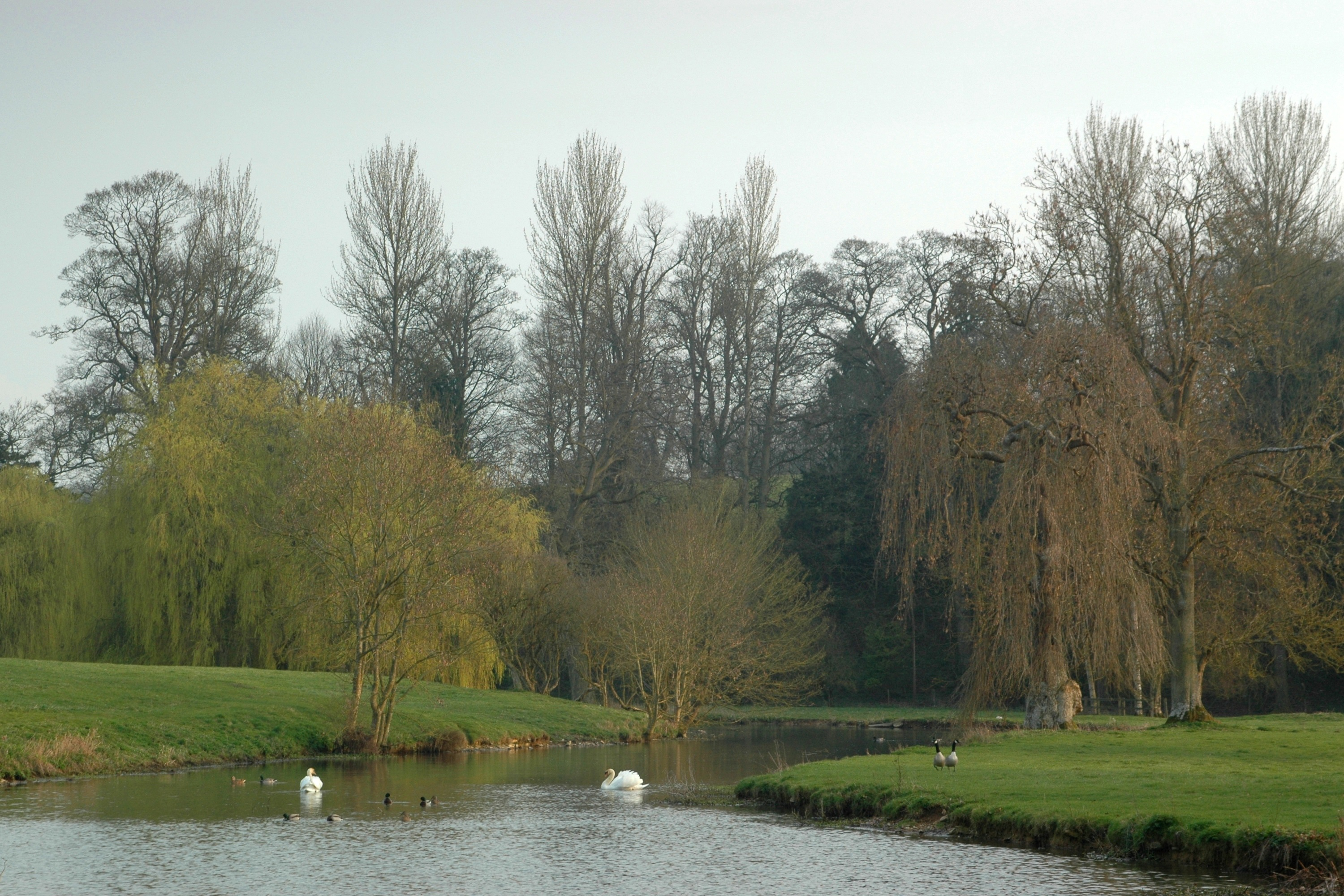
The River Glyme in the grounds of Kiddington Hall

The River Glyme is a river in Oxfordshire, England. It is a tributary of the River Evenlode. It rises about 1 mile (1.6 km) east of Chipping Norton, and flows southeast past Old Chalford, Enstone, Kiddington, Glympton and Wootton, Woodstock and through Blenheim Park. At Wootton the Glyme is joined by a tributary, the River Dorn. The Glyme joins the Evenlode just south of the park near Bladon.

The Glyme is dammed at Cleveley, Kiddington, Glympton and Blenheim. At Blenheim, "Capability" Brown used the river to form the lake in front of Blenheim Palace.

The upper part of the Glyme Valley around the river's headwaters is a Site of Special Scientific Interest.

The Glyme Valley Way footpath follows almost the entire course of the river.

The river's name is derived from the Brittonic for "bright stream".
