= Ashendon Hundred =

Historical division of Buckinghamshire, England

Coordinates: 51.740783°N 0.936771°W

- Ashendon Hundred (black) shown in Buckinghamshire
- Area
  - 1851: 64,841 acres (262.40 km^{2})
- Population
  - 1861: 11,641
- History
  - Created: 11th century
  - Abolished: 1880s
- Status: Hundred
  - HQ: Towersey
- Subdivisions
  - Type: Parishes

Ashendon Hundred was a hundred in the county of Buckinghamshire, England. It was situated in the centre of the county and bordering to the west the county of Oxfordshire near Thame. There was also a small detached portion of the hundred located just to the north west of Aylesbury.

== History ==
Until at least the time of the Domesday Survey in 1086 there were 18 hundreds in Buckinghamshire. It has been suggested however that neighbouring hundreds had already become more closely associated in the 11th century so that by the end of the 14th century the original or ancient hundreds had been consolidated into 8 larger hundreds. Ashendon became the name of the hundred formed from the combined 11th century hundreds of Ashendon, Ixhill and Waddesden, although these original names still persisted in official records until at least the early part of the 17th century. The court leet for Ashendon hundred was usually held twice a year at Towersey, which today is in Oxfordshire. More minor matters could be dealt with at a lesser leet which met every three weeks at Brill.

Ashendon and Waddesden were named after the settlements of the same name where the hundred court met. Ixhill was from Old English yxen hyll, 'oxen hill', a name preserved by Ixhill Farm in Oakley.

== Parishes and hamlets ==
Ashendon hundred comprised the following ancient parishes and hamlets, (formerly medieval vills), allocated to their respective 11th century hundred:

| Ashendon | Ixhill | Waddesden |
|---|---|---|
| Ashendon | Aston Sandford | East Claydon |
| Chearsley | Boarstall | Middle Claydon |
| Grendon Underwood | Brill with Kingswood | Granborough |
| § Hogshaw | Chilton | Fleet Marston |
| Ludgershall | Long Crendon | North Marston |
| Oving | Dorton | Pitchcott |
| Quainton | Ickford | Quarrendon |
| Nether and Upper Winchendon | Ilmer | Waddesdon (with Westcott) |
| Wotton Underwood | Kingsey | Woodham |
| | Oakley | |
| | Shabbington | |
| | Towersey | |
| | Worminghall | |

§ In Waddesdon prior to 1316

== See also ==
- List of hundreds of England and Wales
