= Addingrove =

Former hamlet in Buckinghamshire, England

Coordinates: 51.800°N 1.036°W

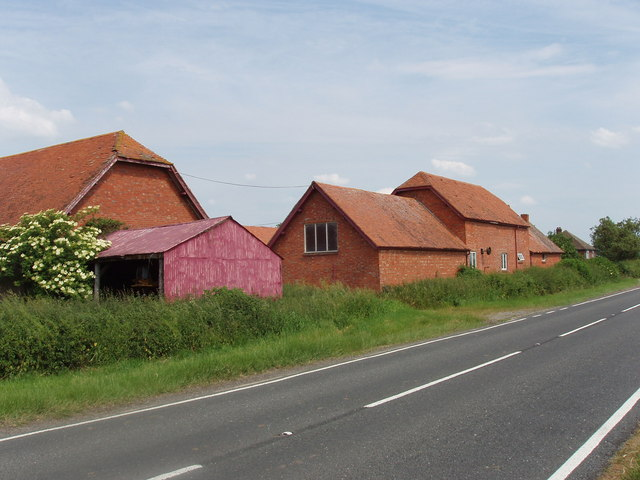
- Addingrove Farm

- Location within Buckinghamshire
- OS grid reference: SP666110
- Civil parish: Oakley
- Unitary authority: Buckinghamshire
- Ceremonial county: Buckinghamshire
- Region: South East
- Country: England
- Sovereign state: United Kingdom
- Post town: Aylesbury
- Postcode district: HP18
- Dialling code: 01844
- Police: Thames Valley
- Fire: Buckinghamshire
- Ambulance: South Central
- UK Parliament: Mid Buckinghamshire
- Website: Oakley Parish Council

Addingrove is a former hamlet in Buckinghamshire, about 4 miles (6.4 km) northwest of the market town of Thame in neighbouring Oxfordshire. The settlement is on the B4011 road between Oakley and Long Crendon.

The largely depopulated former settlement now consists of only Addingrove Farm and a cottage. It is in the civil parish of Oakley.

== Toponym ==
The toponym Addingrove is derived from the Old English for "Æddi's wood". From the 11th to the 15th centuries it evolved through the forms Eddingrave, Adegrave and Adingrave before reaching its present form.

== Manor ==
The Domesday Book of 1086 records that Ulward, a man of Queen Edith, the manor of Eddingrave in the reign of Edward the Confessor, but that after the Norman conquest of England it was granted to Walter Giffard and assessed at three and a half hides. Addingrove remained part of the Honour until 1256, when Giffard's descendant Joan Marshal became married to William de Valence, 1st Earl of Pembroke. After the death of Aymer de Valence, 2nd Earl of Pembroke in 1324, Addingrove passed to William's granddaughter Elizabeth de Comyn. It then passed by Elizabeth's second marriage to Richard Talbot, 2nd Baron Talbot. Talbot also held the manor of Pollicott in Ashendon. When Gilbert Talbot, 5th Baron Talbot died in 1419 he left the manors of Pollicott and Addingrove to his widow Beatrice, who was baroness in her own right until her death in 1421. The two manors were again recorded together in 1432 and 1446, but no subsequent records are known.

Walter Giffard's mesne lord was Hugh de Bolebec, whose heirs were the Earls of Oxford. The mesne lordshire of Addingrove followed that of Whitchurch until 1635.

By 1173 the sub-tenants of the Earls of Oxford were a family called Morel. In 1257 John Morel granted parts of Oakley and Addingrove to John FitzNeil, who then bought the remainder of the manorial tenure from Morel's heirs. Thereafter the tenancy of Addingrove was linked with that of Boarstall until 1563. From 1554 the farm was let to John Croke of Chilton. Croke left the tenancy to his son, also John Dormer, who in 1607 was renting the farm from Sir John Dormer of Dorton. Dormer left Addingrove to his son Sir Robert Dormer, who is said to have passed it to a family called Mitchell. In the 18th century Addingrove passed from Richard Mitchell to Sir John Aubrey, 6th Baronet. Aubrey held the manor of Boarstall, so thereafter Addingrove was once again linked with that manor.

After Addingrove was deserted, its land was divided amongst the villages of Oakley, Brill and Chilton.

== Chapel ==
In about 1142 the Empress Maud granted Oakley church and its dependent chapelries of Brill, Boarstall and Addingrove, to the Augustinian Priory of St Frideswide, Oxford. Addingrove chapel still existed in 1318. Late in the 18th century Addingrove was still a hamlet in the parish of Oakley, but its chapel had been "suffered to fall to ruin".

== Hamlet ==
The possible site of the deserted medieval village and former chapel of Addingrove may be about 0.25 miles (400 m) north of Addingrove Farm. The only remaining building on the site is a derelict barn, but Ordnance Survey maps of 1878 and 1885 show this as the site of the original Addingrove Farm. Slight hollows suggest where a house may have stood, a slight baulk suggests the route of a former track, and ridge and furrow to the west, south and southeast suggest where the limits of the former settlement may have been.

About 0.25 miles (400 m) east of Addingrove Farm the B4011 road between Oakley and Long Crendon crosses a stream, next to which on the east side of the road is a rectilinear medieval ditch that the stream used to feed. The ditch was about 23 feet (7 m) wide and may have been a moat, but there is no trace of a manor house having stood within the rectangle. It may therefore have been a fishpond.

== Sources ==
- Lysons, Daniel; Lysons, Samuel (1806). Magna Britannia: being a concise topographical account of the several counties of Great Britain. Vol. 1. Containing Bedfordshire, Berkshire, and Buckinghamshire. pp. not cited. Archived from the original on 18 August 2007.
- Maurice Beresford (1954). "Lost Villages of England". Lutterworth Press. Archived from the original on 4 November 2016.
- Page, William, ed. (1927). A History of the County of Buckingham, Volume 4. Victoria County History. pp. 80–85.
