= Charles Edmund Clutterbuck =

English painter

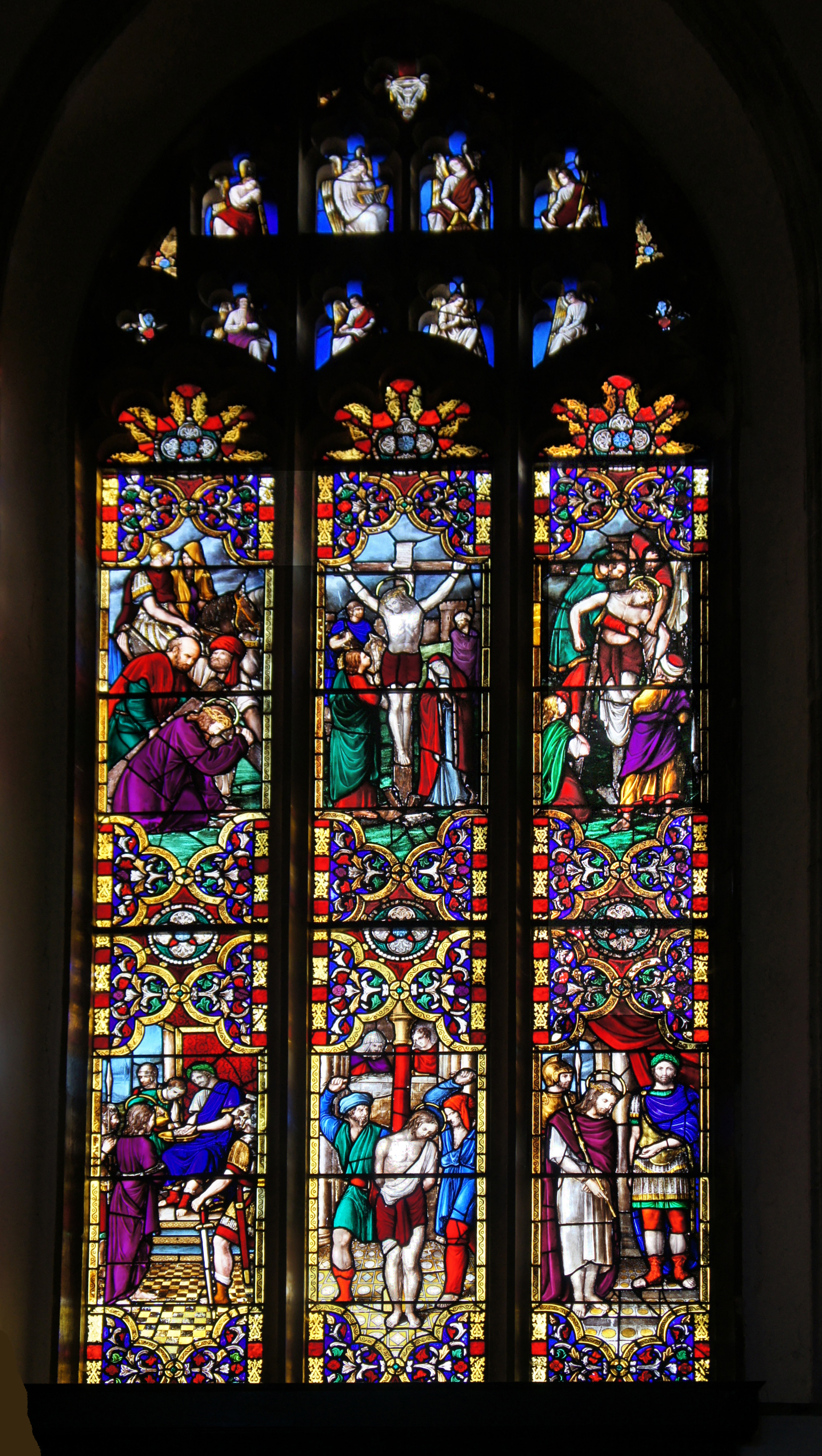
Stained glass by Clutterbuck, showing the trial an Crucifixion of Jesus, St Mary's Church, Bury St Edmunds

Charles Clutterbuck (1806–1861) was an English stained glass artist of the early Victorian era, being a younger contemporary of Thomas Willement and William Warrington

== Personal life ==
Clutterbuck was born in London on 3 September 1806, the son of Edmund and Susannah Clutterbuck, and baptised at Christ Church, Newgate Street, on 28 September 1806.

He married Hannah Kinloch in St John's Church, Waterloo on 16 October 1828.

In the national census of England, June, 1841. the family was living at Maryland Point, Stratford, Essex, and he was described as an artist, with his wife Hannah and three of their children: Helen (Helen Susannah Clutterbuck), Robert (afterwards the Rev. Robert Hawley Clutterbuck), and Charles (Charles Edmund Clutterbuck). In the census of March 1851, Clutterbuck is more fully described as an "Artist on painted glass, employing two men, five boys and one girl." Living with him were his wife, Hannah, and five children: Helen, Robert, Charles, Hannah (Hannah Charlotte Clutterbuck), and Hugh (Hugh Jones Clutterbuck).

By 1861, Clutterbuck and his wife were at living at No. 4, Frances Place, in the parish of All Saints, West Ham. He and his son Charles Edmund Clutterbuck, are described as stained glass painters. Clutterbuck died at Maryland Point on 5 December 1861.

== Work ==
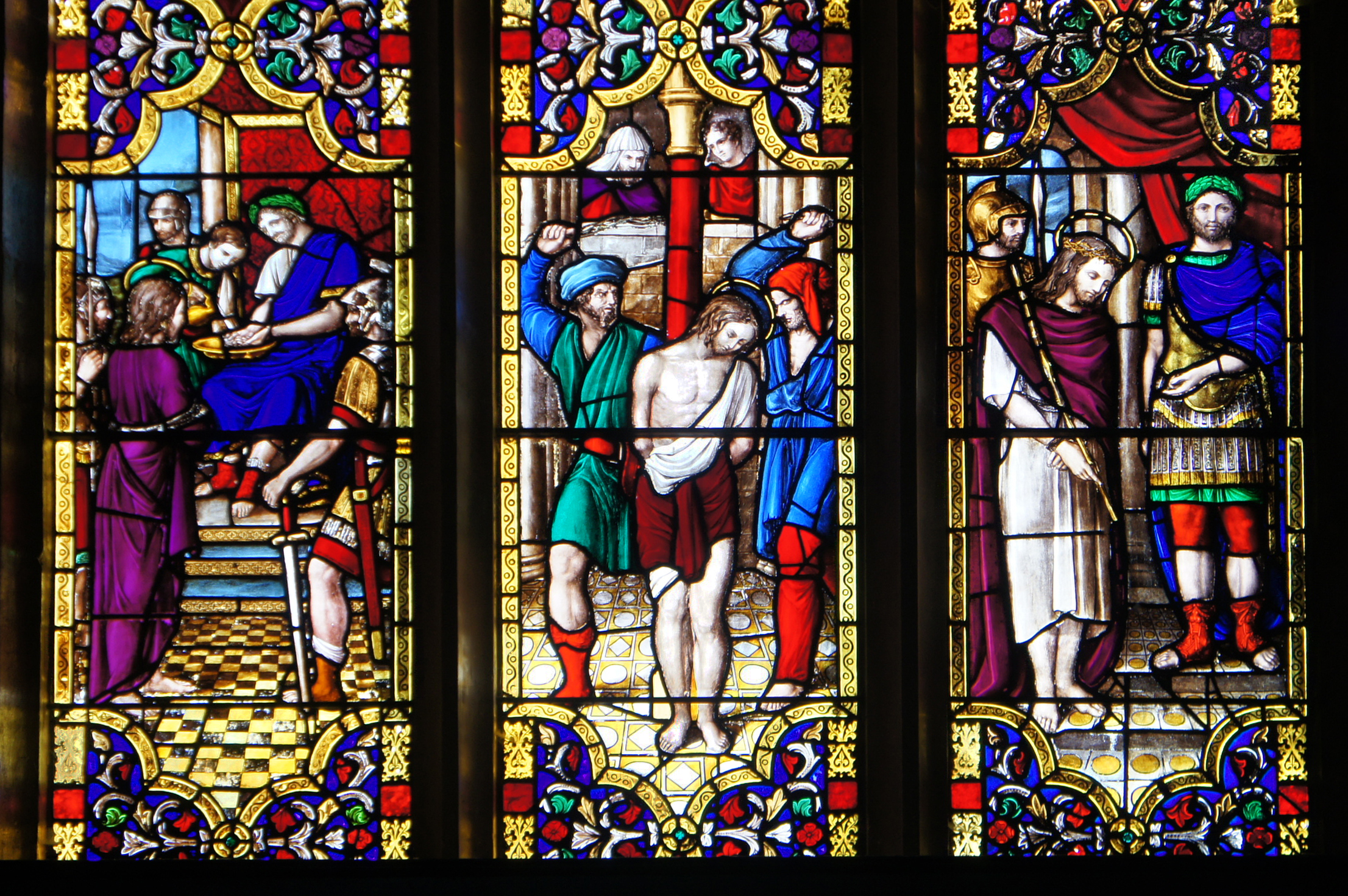
Detail of stained glass by Clutterbuck, showing three scenes from the Trial of Jesus, St Mary's Church, Bury St Edmunds

Charles Clutterbuck was a painter of miniatures, who exhibited his works at the Royal Academy. He began working in stained glass in the 1830s, with the commission for his earliest known window, at St Digain's Church, Llangernyw, Conwy, being 1830.

Examples of his work can be seen in many churches in the South East of England and is represented at the cathedrals of Norwich and Ely, and at St Mary's Church, Bury St Edmunds. A large example of his work is the east window of St Anne's Limehouse, a church by Nicholas Hawksmoor which had suffered fire damage in 1850.

Examples of his work may be found in Sydney, Australia, including the east window of the Garrison Church, Millers Point.

His son, Charles Edmund Clutterbuck(1839–1883) carried on the business until 1882.

== Style ==
Clutterbuck employed the techniques used by 18th century stained glass artists, rather than those imitating Mediaeval stained glass favoured by Gothic Revival studios. This involved painting on sections of glass that were comparatively large, using a matrix of ground glass, and then annealing the surface in a kiln. This process was sometimes not entirely successful, with the details of some windows such as those at St Anne's, Limehouse, suffering losses over the years.

Clutterbuck's windows are Classical depictions of Biblical narratives, with dynamic action and dramatic characterisation.

== Examples of Work ==
Jesus raising Jairus' daughter, detail of a window, c 1859, by Charles Clutterbuck, in Christ Church, St Laurence, Sydney, Australia.

England

- St. Mary's Church, Oakley, Buckinghamshire
- St. Peter and St. Paul's Church, Worminghall, Buckinghamshire
- Ely Cathedral, Ely, Cambridgeshire, Cambridgeshire
- St. Anne's Church, Limehouse, Greater London
- St. Bartholomew's Church, Brisley, Norfolk
- St. Andrew's Church, Buxton, Norfolk
- Norwich Cathedral, Norwich, Norfolk
- St Mary's Church, Bury St Edmunds, Suffolk

Wales

- St Digain's Church, Llangernyw, Conwy County
- Church of St Ffraid, Llansantffraed, Conwy County
- Church of St Eurgain and St Peter, Northop, Flintshire

Australia

- Garrison Church, Millers Point, New South Wales
- St Thomas' Anglican Church, Mulgoa, New South Wales
- Christ Church St Laurence, Sydney, New South Wales
- St Andrew's Cathedral, Sydney, New South Wales
