= Brill Palace =

Medieval English royal residence

Coordinates: 51.82°N 1.05°W

Brill Palace was a medieval English royal residence located in the village of Brill in the Aylesbury Vale, Buckinghamshire. It was within the jurisdiction of the former Ashendon Hundred.

Brill Palace was founded during the Heptarchy and was used by Edward the Confessor. Henry II visited it at least twice, in 1160 and 1162. In 1203, John granted the manor of Brill to Walter Borstard, his chaplain, at the same time naming Borstard keeper of the palace. Henry III was in residence during 1224; he stayed at Missenden Abbey several times while en route to Brill and is recorded as having rewarded the monks for their hospitality with presents of timber. The manor subsequently passed to Hugh de Neville in 1226 and Richard, 1st Earl of Cornwall by 1233. In 1252, a hermitage dedicated to Saint Werburgh was established by Henry III, with the condition that the canons of Chetwode, who were responsible for the endowment, should supply chaplains not only for the hermitage but also for the chapel of Brill Palace. During the English Civil War, a royal garrison held the palace from November 1642 to April 1643, repulsing an attack by parliamentary forces under the command of John Hampden.

The ruins of the palace were still visible in 1885, and the site remains a scheduled ancient monument.

== See also ==
- Nonsuch Palace
