= Oakley, Buckinghamshire =

Village in Buckinghamshire, England

Coordinates: 51.804°N 1.072°W

Oakley
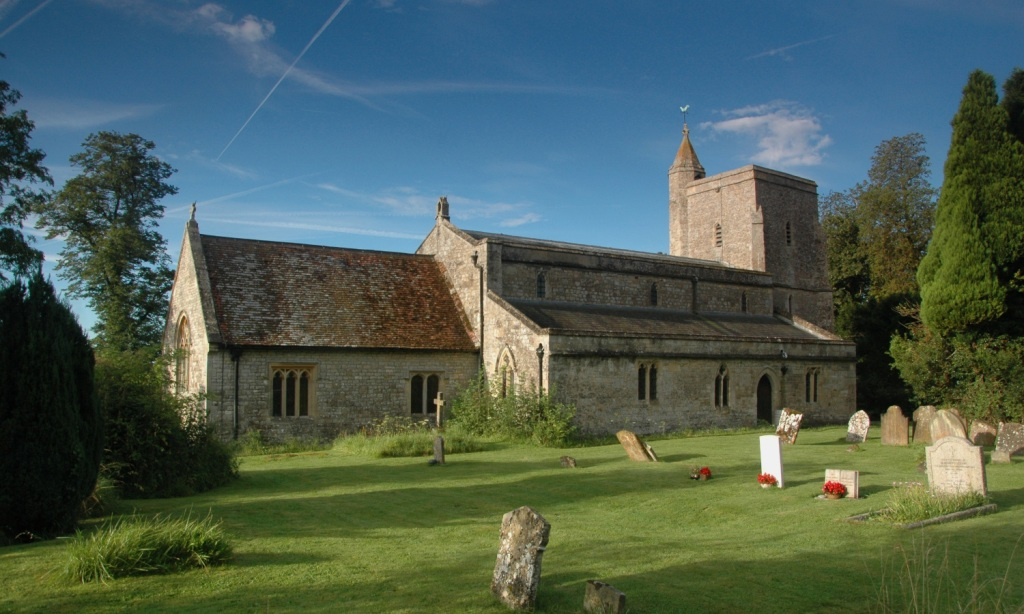
- St Mary's Parish Church, Oakley

- Location within Buckinghamshire
- Population: 1,128 (2021)
- OS grid reference: SP6312
- Civil parish: Oakley
- Unitary authority: Buckinghamshire
- Ceremonial county: Buckinghamshire
- Region: South East
- Country: England
- Sovereign state: United Kingdom
- Post town: AYLESBURY
- Postcode district: HP18
- Dialling code: 01844
- Police: Thames Valley
- Fire: Buckinghamshire
- Ambulance: South Central
- UK Parliament: Mid Buckinghamshire
- Website: Oakley Social Centre (Village Hall)

Oakley is a village and civil parish in Buckinghamshire, England. It has an area of 2,206 acres (893 ha) and includes about 400 households. The 2021 Census recorded the population as 1,128.

At one time it was thought Oakley held a rare (and possibly unique) double distinction, in that a Victoria Cross recipient, Edward Brooks, and a Medal of Honor recipient, James J. Pym, were both born in the village. However, the latter, a namesake of a contemporary James Pym from Oakley, has been found to be from Garsington, a village 10 miles (16 km) away in Oxfordshire.

In 1963 Oakley was centre of national and international news, when Leatherslade Farm, near Oakley, was used as a hideout by the criminal gang involved in the Great Train Robbery.

== Geography ==
The parish is in the west of Buckinghamshire, adjoining the boundary with Oxfordshire. It is roughly diamond shaped, extending a maximum 4.35 miles (7 km) east to west and 2 miles (3.2 km) south to north. Oakley parish is bounded to the north-west by Boarstall parish, north-east by Brill, east by Chilton, south by Ickford and Worminghall and in the extreme west by Horton-cum-Studley in Oxfordshire. There were once four hamlets that stood within the vicinity of the parish of Oakley. Brill and Boarstall are now parishes in their own right. The hamlet of Studley was, many years ago, annexed to nearby Horton in Oxfordshire, to become Horton-cum-Studley. The hamlet of Little London became part of Oakley parish in 1934 and lies to the north of the B4011 road. The hamlet of Addingrove now no longer exists and its chapel has long since fallen into disrepair, but Addingrove Farm still exists and is 1.75 miles (2.8 km) south-east of Oakley. The hamlet of The Foresters lies about 750 yards to the North-West of Oakley on the B4011, it consists of twelve houses, including a former public house called The Foresters (closed in 1917).

The village proper is about 3.5 miles (5.6 km) north-west of Long Crendon and 1-mile (1.6 km) south of Brill, mainly to the south of the B4011 road, midway between Thame and Bicester. The land is generally just below 300 feet (91 m) above sea level, that contour passing through Little London Green. At one time the village was owned by the dukes of Marlborough.

== Etymology ==
Oakley's toponym is derived from Old English meaning "Oak-lea", a clearing within the oaks. Originally, the village was probably a collection of small huts around the stream, at the church end of the village, although the parish church as it is known today had not been built. The village would have been in Bernwood Forest. The Forest was not oak trees from horizon to horizon. In the Early Middle Ages a forest was a legally defined hunting area, with some densely wooded areas, shrub land, parks of pastureland and areas of cultivation.

Oakley's name has been variously spelt through the ages (parenthesised dates denote earliest occurrence): Achelei (1086); Akeley (12th century), Aclei, Acle, Ocle (13th century); Ocle iuxta Brehull (14th century); and Whokeley (16th century).

== History ==
=== 11th to 13th centuries ===
Before the Norman Conquest two hides of land in Oakley belonged to Alwid (or Ælfgeth) the maid, and another half a hide of land granted her by Godric the sheriff on condition that she taught his daughter embroidery. Alwid is supposed to have been the same lady who held lands in Wiltshire under the name of Leuide, embroiderer to the King and Queen.

Oakley, like a number of English settlements, has its first written mention in the Domesday Book in 1086. It was a settlement in the Hundred of Ixhill. Robert Doyley, son of Walter, held Achelei (as Oakley was called). The exact area is not known, since borders with other local villages were not specified. The village was valued at £6, and its land consisted of 5¾ hides; with Oakley's clay soil the total cultivated land would have been around 550 acres (220 ha). Seven ploughs, three by the Lord of the Manor and four by nine villagers (consisting of seven smallholdings) tilled the land. There were three slaves in the village and there was enough woodland for 200 pigs. Other local places mentioned in the Domesday Book were Brill, Addingrove and Nashway.

The earliest parts, the nave and some pillars, of the present church date from around 1100. In 1142 Empress Matilda granted Oakley parish church, with its chapels of Brill, Boarstall and Addingrove to the monks of St Frideswide's Priory, in Oxford. St Frideswide's Monastery much later became Christ Church, Oxford. In 1208 William Basset was confirmed by King John, the knight's fee of Oakley (i.e. the Manor of Oakley), which his grandfather Osmund had held by charter of Brian FitzCount. In 1222 Ralphe de Norwich became first Rector of Oakley, appointed by the Henry III who had recovered the right of advowson by judgement of his Court at Westminster. Ralphe later founded the priory at Chetwode in 1226. A transaction in 1224 mentions selions (cultivated strips of land) in Oakley, suggesting an open field system, i.e. no fences or hedges. The Oakley area would have been a populated landscape of mixed farming and woodland, with roadways, drovers' roads, flocks of sheep, herds of cattle and pigs, small areas of meadow, and open fields of barley and oats (and possibly some wheat).

=== 14th to 16th centuries ===
1327 John de Abingdon became the first vicar of Oakley (as opposed to rector). 1349 William de Grauntpont died in office as vicar of Oakley, probably of the Black Death. The first estimate of Oakley's population was, made by Lysons, of 257 in 1377.

In 1522 Oakley's population of men eligible for military service (ages 16–60) was estimated at 140. The oldest existing houses in the village date from around this time. In 1570 coppicing enclosures drew complaints from Richard Leigh of Oakley (lord of Oakley). In 1586 Oakley had about 248 inhabitants in 56 households (22 landholders and 58 with small cottages within the Forest). These figures were drawn up by Hugh Cope of Oakley in his Court of the Exchequer return.

In 1589 Roman Catholic layman Thomas Belson escaped capture in Aston Rowant, Oxfordshire and fled to Ixhill Lodge in Oakley, where he hid in a priest hole. After some time he went to Oxford but was captured, tried and convicted in London and was hanged, drawn and quartered in Oxford.

=== 17th century ===
In 1603 the Return of Communicants gave Oakley's population as 238. In the period 1622 to 1635 the Crown decided to remove Royal Forest status from Bernwood Forest, along with the severe laws protecting its contents (wood, animals and people). This was a most significant event for Oakley (and Brill and Boarstall), and transformed the economic balance of society. It modernised the farming structures of the communities in ways that left problems of poverty and rural under-employment for the smallholders and the landless.

The process of disafforestation – analogous in modern terms to privatisation – should not be confused with deforestation, meaning to strip a forest of its trees. Nevertheless, disafforestation of Bernwood Forest led to a gradual deforestation over subsequent centuries.

The Cottrell-Dormer enumeration of cottages recorded Oakley's population as 122 in 1622. In 1626 nine men were summoned to Aylesbury to resolve disafforestation issues. Two, Sir Timothy Tyrrell and John Dynham, were from Oakley.

The effect of the English Civil War of 1642–46 on Oakley is unrecorded. It was near the front line between the Parliamentarian and Royalist sides. It was at this time the church font was smashed, according to local tradition, by Parliamentarian troops. Foraging by soldiers from both sides would have made caused even more problems to local villagers exacerbating problems due to disafforestation. In 1662, according to Hearth tax returns the population was 238. The Compton Census returned a population of 258 for Oakley in 1676.

=== 18th century ===
Bishop Wake's visitation returns recorded Oakley as having 216 inhabitants. In 1713 a lace school is recorded as being in the village. On 8 May 1718 George I made William Cadogan the 1st Baron Cadogan of Oakley. Oakley's surviving parish records start in 1726, later than many English parishes. Most local parishes have registers dating from the 16th century, Worminghall going back to 1538.

The index of the Poll for Knights of the Shire for the County of Bucks in April 1784, listed 11 knights in Oakley: Edward Batt, Thomas Dorrington, Isaac Fennimore, Thomas Hawes, Francis Kirby, Leonard Paulin, Robert Piers, Thomas Needham Rees, John Stevens, Reverend Robert Twicross and Thomas Wyatt.

In 1790 Mark Ing was recorded as being a member of the Oakley Morris Men. In 1798 Buckinghamshire was the only county to have kept a complete record of an early census called Posse Commitatus. Oakley at this time had 21 farmers, a cordwainer, a carpenter, a pedlar and a schoolmaster (although Oakley's school was not established until the 1850s). 24 labourers and 12 other men were listed.

=== 19th century ===
The United Kingdom Census of 1801 recorded 257 inhabitants in 65 families living in 34 houses recorded in Oakley. The 1811 census recorded 325 people in Oakley. The first attempt to enclose Oakley was in 1818 and was unsuccessful.

382 people were recorded in the 1821 census. In the same year, the enclosure of common land was opposed by a mob that tried to prevent the attorney attaching notice of it to the church door. Villagers were outraged because large areas of land were granted to local landowners and 155 acres (63 ha) were sold to cover the cost of the enclosure. Only 25 acres (10 ha) were awarded to smallholders and only 4 acres (1.6 ha) were set aside for the poor. The poor in Oakley would have to survive on what was left of Poor Folk's Pasture in Boarstall parish, itself subject to stringent eligibility rules. The enclosure listed every landowner in the village. The 1831 census gave Oakley's population as 413. In 1833 a turnpike was approved between Bicester and Thame, passing through the centre of Oakley. This is now the B4011 and bypasses the village.

The first four censuses were merely a head count, but the United Kingdom Census 1841 was more detailed.

On 20 October 1844, the hamlet of Studley, which had been part of Oakley parish, was transferred to Horton-cum-Studley in Oxfordshire, as a result of Counties (Detached Parts) Act 1844

The 1851 census noted that houses had been demolished in Oakley as villagers left (for English cities and emigration to the Americas). The population was 425.

Oakley School was first recorded in use in 1853, in what is now School Lane. The first headmaster was Henry Fenemore.

In the 1860s Charles Edmund Clutterbuck, a master stained glass artist, made two windows for the parish church. They are the south window in the vestry and the east window in the north aisle. Between the years 1880–1887 Oakley church was re-dedicated from Saint Matthew to Saint Mary.

In 1889 a new local magazine was first printed, Waddesdon Deanery News. There was no mention of any Oakley people in the page of Oakley news in issue 1. However, in issue Number 2 in February 1889 carried the story about a pantomime and concert at the school – a complete success that befittingly crowned the exertions and careful organisations of its promoter, Miss Boys. A full-dress rehearsal of the piece was given on the previous evening to the Sunday School. Children were not invited in vain, a tea feast (generously given by Mrs. Kirby) winding up an extra-special treat, which coming as a surprise was all the more thoroughly enjoyed.

The first Parish Council was formed on 19 December 1894. Its members were Thomas Brooks, James Eborn, Rev. William Greenwood, James Kirby and Thomas Kirby.

=== 20th century ===
Oakley Public Library (in the Lady Verney Reading Room) was opened on 17 February 1911 and closed in 1936.

On 1 August 1910 the British painter etcher and engraver James Henry Govier was born at Oakley to Henry and Mary Ann (née Measey) Govier. In 1914 the family moved to Gorseinon in Glamorgan.

During the First World War about 93 village boys went to war, of which 23 gave their lives for their country, including four brothers named Measey. Charles, Frank, George and Thomas were the sons of Joseph and Martha Measey (née Gladdy) of The Royal Oak. Thomas the first to be killed was a private in the 101st Machine Gun Corps. He died on 20 January 1917 aged 33 and was buried at the Cite Bonjean Military Cemetery at Armentieres in France. Charles was a private in the 146th Machine Gun Corps and was killed on 11 November 1917. He is buried at the Aeroplane Cemetery in Belgium. Frank was a corporal in the 7th Battalion of the Oxfordshire and Buckinghamshire Light Infantry. He was killed in action on 22 June 1918 and was buried at the Karasouli Military Cemetery on the Macedonian front in Greece. George the fourth son to be die, was a private in the 2nd/4th Battalion of the Oxfordshire and Buckinghamshire Light Infantry. He ended up as a wounded prisoner of war at the Hotel Berthad at Chateau Loes in Switzerland and died of illness on 5 October 1918. He is buried at St. Martin's Cemetery, Vevey, Switzerland.

Victoria Cross recipient Edward Brooks was born in Oakley, winning his medal at Fayet, near St Quentin, France on 28 April 1917. While taking part in a raid on the enemy's trenches, he saw that the front wave was being checked by an enemy machine gun. On his own initiative he rushed forward from the second wave, killed one of the gunners with his revolver and bayoneted another. The remainder of the gun crew then made off, leaving the gun, whereupon the company sergeant-major turned it on the retreating enemy, after which he carried it back to Allied lines. His action prevented many casualties and added to the success of the operation.

The alehouse called The Foresters on the Bicester Road closed in about 1919. An alehouse was an ordinary domestic house in which people were allowed to come into the kitchen or front room to drink beer, but not spirits.

In 1934, by Bucks Review Order, Little London, then part of Brill, was added to Oakley.

On 27 May 1942 RAF Oakley opened and became operational, initially a satellite airfield for RAF Bicester and then in August 1942 as RAF Westcott's satellite. No 11 Operational Training Unit (No 11 OTU) moved to Westcott in September 1942, multiple Vickers Wellingtons were located here. After Victory in Europe Day in 1945, orders were received to clear the hangar and fit it for the provision of refreshment and succour to thousands of repatriated prisoners of war brought here as part of Operation Exodus. RAF Oakley was closed to flying in August of that year.

Two men from Oakley died in the war and are commemorated on the Oakley Roll of Honour.

Halls Brewery gave the playing fields to Oakley Village in 1948.

In 1957 Oakley Village Hall was completed having been built and financed by the village. In 1959 the original Oakley School in Bicester Road was closed and Oakley Combined School in Worminghall Road was opened, the first new post-war school to be built in Aylesbury Vale. The Sun Inn, an alehouse rather than a public house, closed in about 1961.

In 1963 Oakley was centre of national and international news, when Leatherslade Farm, near Oakley, was used as a hideout by the criminal gang involved in the Great Train Robbery. John Maris, a local farm worker, alerted police to the hideout at the farm. John Wooley, a local policeman from Brill, was the first officer to go to the hideout.

On 16 January 1991 Malcolm Rifkind opened the section of the M40 motorway: the 11.4-mile (18.3 km) stretch between Waterstock and Wendlebury, passing through Oakley parish. In 1997 the Oakley Village Appraisal / ACORN report reviewed what villagers thought about the village and what changes they would like to see. It was the most successful village appraisal in Buckinghamshire for a village of Oakley's size, with over 70% response.

=== 21st century ===
In 2003 Oakley featured in national and international news again through an exhibition marking the 40th anniversary of the Great Train Robbery. The guest speakers included the mastermind behind the robbery and ex-gang-leader Bruce Reynolds, John Wooley and John Maris (see above) – all meeting for the first time. On show were memorabilia from the robbery, Bruce Reynold's Lotus Cortina, the lorry and one of the Land Rovers used in the raid. Like a number of other English villages, in the years between 2000 and 2011, Oakley lost many local facilities, including its post office, shop, surgery, filling station and one of its pubs (the Royal Oak). The remaining businesses include one public house (the Chandos Arms) and Oakley Garage.

On 28 April 2017, a paving stone will be laid at the foot of the war memorial to commemorate 100 years since the winning of a Victoria Cross by Edward Brooks in Fayet, France on 28 April 1917 (only two such stones will be laid in Buckinghamshire).

On 30 September 2021, Oakley Parish Council bought the Chandos Arms. from Punch Taverns. after the company had threatened to de-licence this last remaining pub and sell it as a development opportunity. This action will ensure the facility is available for the villagers over the next decades. Other plans for the village in 2022 are a small shop and cafe attached to the village hall and rollout of ultrafast broadband to the village.

St. Mary's parish is now part of the Church of England Benefice of Worminghall with Ickford, Oakley and Shabbington.

Oakley Church of England Combined School is a mixed, voluntary controlled primary school, that takes children between the ages of four and 11. It has about 100 pupils.

The village had a football club, Oakley United, which was successful in the Oxford Senior League and Oving Cup during the 2010s.

== Other local information ==
- Addingrove was a hamlet with a chapel of ease, no longer in existence, southeast of Oakley.
- Little London is a hamlet north of the B4011. It is now attached to Oakley but until 1934 it was part of the parish of Brill.
- Oakley featured obliquely in J.R.R. Tolkien's comic novella Farmer Giles of Ham, in which Oakley is the first village ravaged (and its parson eaten) by the dragon Chrysophylax Dives. ("Ham" is Thame, Oxfordshire, 6 miles (10 km) away).

== Notable residents ==
- Edward Brooks (1883–1944), recipient of the Victoria Cross, was born in Oakley.
- James Henry Govier (1910–74), British artist, was born in the village.
- Colin (born 1969) and Jonny Greenwood (born 1971) of the pop group Radiohead lived in the village when young.
- Max Mosley (1940–2021), president of the Fédération Internationale de l'Automobile.
- Elizabeth Tyrrell (1619–83), daughter of churchman Dr. James Ussher and wife of Sir Timothy Tyrrell (below).
- James Tyrrell (1643–1718), Commissioner of the Privy Seal from 1697.
- John Tyrrell (1646–92), Second Admiral of the East Indies.
- Sir Timothy Tyrrell (1617–1701), army officer, Master of the Buckhounds to Charles I.
- Stan Woodell (1928–2004), botanist, lived in the village from the 1960s until his death.
