= Rose Hill Cemetery, Oxford =

Cemetery in Oxford, England

Rose Hill Cemetery
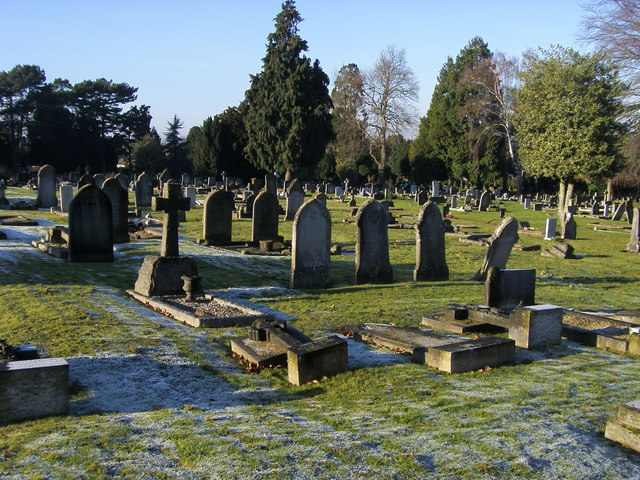
- Part of the cemetery
- Interactive map of Rose Hill Cemetery

Details
- Established: 1889
- Location: Rose Hill, Oxford, England
- Type: Public

Rose Hill Cemetery is a cemetery located in Rose Hill, Oxford, England. It was opened in 1889 and has more than 20,000 burials. It covers over 11 acres (45,000 m^{2}) and has a Victorian chapel. The cemetery is closed to new burials.

The cemetery contains 28 Commonwealth graves from World War I, and 58 from World War II.

Edward Brooks (1883–1944), recipient of the Victoria Cross in World War I, is buried in Rose Hill.

== See also ==
- Wolvercote Cemetery
