= RAF Oakley =

Disused British military airfield

RAF Oakley
- Near Oakley, Buckinghamshire in England
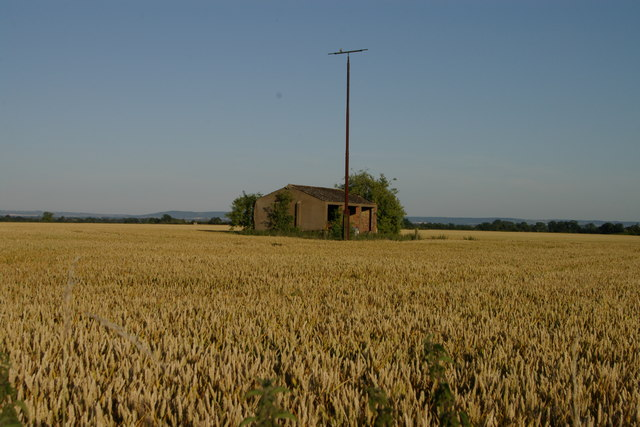
- An old airfield building of the former RAF Oakley surrounded by corn.

Site information
- Type: Royal Air Force satellite station
- Owner: Air Ministry
- Operator: Royal Air Force

Location
- Location within Buckinghamshire RAF Oakley (the United Kingdom)
- Coordinates: 51°46′57″N 001°04′30″W

Site history
- Built: 1941
- In use: 1942-1953
- Battles/wars: European theatre of World War II

RAF Oakley is a former Royal Air Force satellite station between Oakley and Worminghall, Buckinghamshire, England. It was located in a flat, damp wooded area.

== History ==
=== Second World War usage ===
Intended as RAF Westcott's satellite, the land at Field Farm had been requisitioned by the War Office, and the airfield built. RAF Oakley was ready before its parent station so, when it opened on 27 May 1942, it became RAF Bicester's second satellite. In August 1942 it switched to its intended status and when No. 11 Operational Training Unit RAF moved to Westcott in September 1942, and Oakley became that unit's satellite where it placed some of its Vickers Wellington ICs.

In the autumn of 1943, Hercules-engined Wellingtons came increasingly into use and the OTU's air gunnery training section was located at Oakley. Conversion training for bomber crews was Oakley's primary role, which continued to the end of the war during the final year of which most personnel were trained for overseas squadrons.

=== Operation EXODUS ===
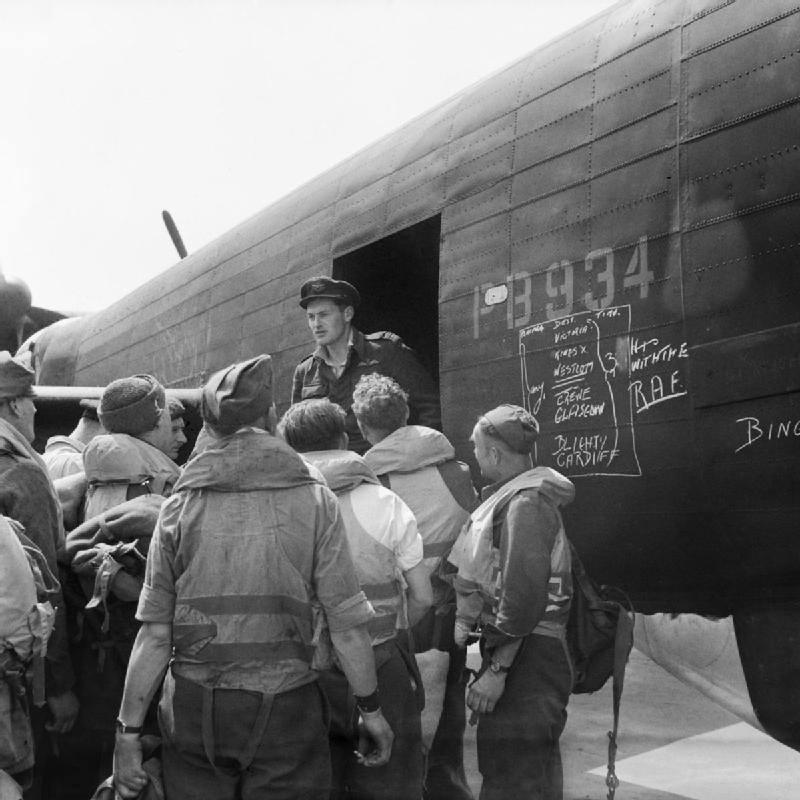
British former prisoners of war prepare to board an Avro Lancaster B Mark I, PB934, of No. 582 Squadron RAF at Lübeck, Germany, for repatriation to the United Kingdom, 11 May 1945

After the end of hostilities in Europe, orders were received on 2 May 1945 that 300 repatriated prisoners of war were arriving by air at 1100. All arrangements were made for their reception, and the provision of refreshments laid on in the Social Club. The arrival was, in fact, postponed to later in the day. Seven Douglas Dakotas landed with repatriated POWs on the following day and more throughout the month, until by the end of May, 72 Dakotas had brought 1,787 PoWs. Operation EXODUS was in full swing and May 1945 was even busier with 443 Avro Lancasters, 103 Dakotas, 51 Handley Page Halifaxes, 31 Consolidated Liberators, 3 Short Stirlings, 3 Lockheed Hudsons, and 2 Boeing Fortresses bringing 15,088 personnel.

== Current use ==
RAF Oakley closed to flying in August 1945, but remains very visibly a wartime airfield, whose main runway remains largely intact with a 'T2' hangar retaining its wartime black finish. Temporary brick wartime buildings stand alongside a 'B1' hangar.

Local people use the runway informally for cycling and running.

The T2 hangar is now gone, it was demolished and a modern industrial complex built in its place, there are however still some buildings nearby that are left and the pole for the windsocks still stands near to the C.O's and O.C flying's homes which are still in use today, and the brick base of the control tower is still in place but as a flat roof storage shed, the rest of the tower is also gone.

On the south east of the airfield, about 100m outside of the perimeter track, is a very well preserved Battle Headquarters building (BHQ). The rooms and corridors inside are all accessible, as is the observation room itself, allowing 360 degree views when the airfield was operational, but now partially obscured by trees. The escape hatch is missing, but the original ladder is still in place, and can still be used to access the roof (August 2020).

In December 2020 a Planning Application was submitted to convert the site into an autonomous vehicle testing facility. This would involve the removal of the main 2000 yard runway, and half of the shorter 1600 yard runway. As at December 2023 the project had been suspended due to construction issues, and the main hangar put up for long-term lease. Whilst still closed off to the public, all runways are still present, but severely damaged.

== Popular culture ==
- RAF Oakley was the fictional Royal Air Force station in England in the film Pearl Harbor, which was actually filmed at Badminton House.
- RAF Oakley was used as a film location in 1982 in the James Bond film Octopussy, for the sequence where Bianca, while driving the Range Rover with the horse box trailer containing the Acrostar jet, helps Bond to escape from his captors. The majority of the title sequence locations and the hangar interiors were filmed at RAF Northolt, Middlesex.

The hangar, that was supposedly destroyed by a missile in the film, is in fact intact and a warehouse used by Natural Building Technologies, a merchant of building materials.

- However, RAF Oakley was used in the filming of an episode of Midsomer Murders from 2003.
