= Edward Brooks (VC) =

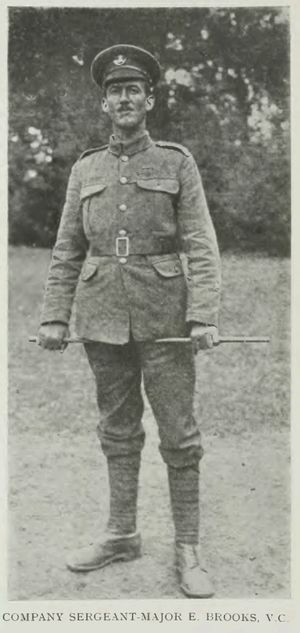
- Born: 11 April 1883; Oakley, Buckinghamshire, England
- Died: 26 June 1944 (aged 61); Oxford, Oxfordshire, England
- Burial place: Rose Hill Cemetery, Oxford, Oxfordshire, England
- Military career
- Allegiance: United Kingdom
- Branch: British Army
- Service years: 1914–1919
- Rank: Company Sergeant Major
- Service number: 201154
- Units: Grenadier Guards; Oxfordshire and Buckinghamshire Light Infantry
- Conflicts: World War I
- Awards: Victoria Cross

Company Sergeant Major Edward Brooks VC (11 April 1883 – 26 June 1944) was a British Army soldier and an English recipient of the Victoria Cross (VC), the highest and most prestigious award for gallantry in the face of the enemy that can be awarded to British and Commonwealth forces.

== Details ==
Edward Brooks was born in Oakley, Buckinghamshire, on 11 April 1883 and baptised in Oakley Church on 20 January 1884. He was one of twelve children of Thomas (born in Oakley in 1855) and Selina Brooks (born in Halesowen, Worcestershire in 1857).

He was 34 years old, and a Company Sergeant Major in the 2/4th Battalion, Oxfordshire and Buckinghamshire Light Infantry, British Army during the First World War when the following deed took place for which he was awarded the VC.

On 28 April 1917 at Fayet, near Saint-Quentin, France, Company Sergeant-Major Brooks, while taking part in a raid on the enemy's trenches, saw that the front wave was being checked by an enemy machine gun. On his own initiative he rushed forward from the second wave, killed one of the gunners with his revolver and bayoneted another. The remainder of the gun crew then made off, leaving the gun, whereupon the company sergeant-major turned it on the retreating enemy, after which he carried it back to Allied lines. His courageous action undoubtedly prevented many casualties and greatly added to the success of the operation.

Brooks received his Victoria Cross from the King on 18 July 1917, and on his return to Oxford was met at the railway station by the Mayor and Corporation and driven in a carriage preceded by the Headington Silver Band to Headington. After a presentation at Headington Manor House he returned to his home at 16 Windsor Street.

An Oxfordshire blue plaque was unveiled on his Headington home on 29 July 2017. He is also named prominently on the front panel of the plinth unveiled at the new student accommodation in James Wolfe Road, Oxford on 16 August 2019 at the site of Cowley Barracks.

== Medal ==
His VC is displayed at the Royal Green Jackets (Rifles) Museum, Winchester, England.

== Bibliography ==
- Gliddon, Gerald (2012) [1998]. Arras and Messines 1917. VCs of the First World War. The History Press. ISBN 978-0-7524-6604-0.
