= Godric the Sheriff =

Anglo Saxon sheriff

Godric (died c. 1066) was the Anglo Saxon sheriff of Berkshire and possibly Buckinghamshire in the 11th century prior to the Norman Conquest.

The High Sheriff of Berkshire's chief residences were at Wallingford and Aldermaston. As a sheriff, Godric had the powers of arrest, he could raise armies, collect taxes and levies, and he presided over courts, dealt with traitors and generally supervised on the King's behalf everything that went on in the area of the Kingdom under his jurisdiction. It was recorded that Godric was "a colourful old scoundrel".

Godric had at least one daughter, who was taught gold embroidery by a maid called Aelfgyth in Oakley, Buckinghamshire before the Norman Conquest. Henry de Ferrers had acquired lands at Stanford in the Vale, Berkshire (now Oxfordshire) belonging to Godric the Sheriff, probably between 1055 and 1067. Finally, there is a mention of "Godric the Sheriff, of Fyfield (Berkshire, now Oxfordshire)" as being a member of King Harold Godwinson's forces at the Battle of Hastings in 1066.
