= RAF Westcott =

Former RAF base in Buckinghamshire, England

RAF Westcott
- Near Westcott, Buckinghamshire in England
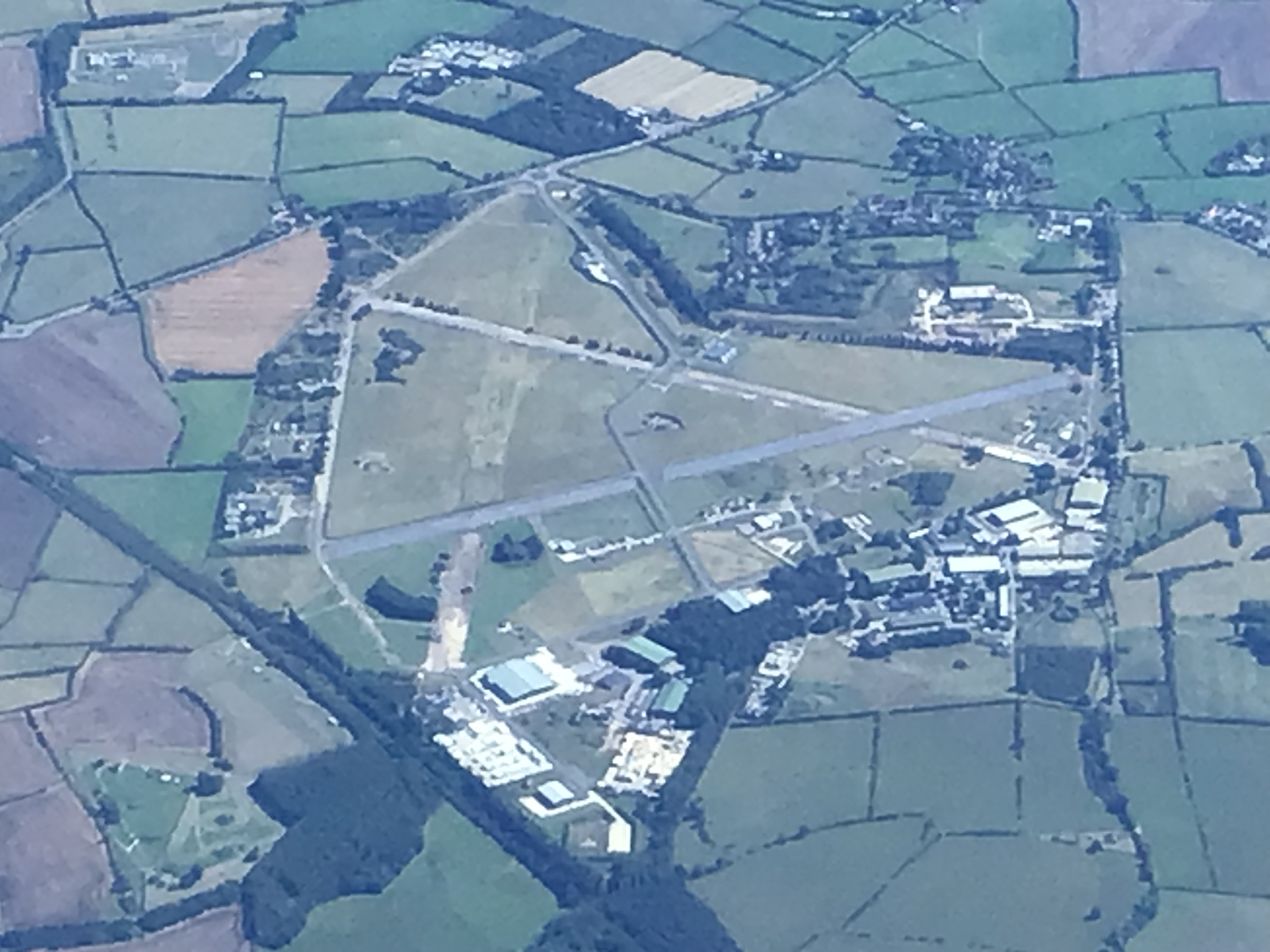
- Aerial view of RAF Westcott

Site information
- Type: Royal Air Force station
- Code: WX
- Owner: Ministry of Defence
- Operator: Royal Air Force
- Controlled by: RAF Bomber Command * No. 91 (OTU) Group RAF * No. 92 (OTU) Group RAF

Location
- Shown within Buckinghamshire RAF Westcott (the United Kingdom)
- Coordinates: 51°50′46″N 000°58′15″W

Site history
- Built: 1941/42
- In use: September 1942 - 1995
- Fate: Transferred to the Ministry of Supply in 1946 and became the home for the Rocket Propulsion Establishment
- Battles/wars: European theatre of World War II

Airfield information
- Elevation: 70 metres (230 ft) AMSL
Runways
Direction	Length and surface
00/00	Concrete
00/00	Concrete
00/00	Concrete

RAF Westcott is a former Royal Air Force station located near Westcott in Buckinghamshire, England. The site fully opened in September 1942 and was the base of No. 11 Operational Training Unit (OTU) flying the Vickers Wellington medium bomber until the RAF moved out in August 1945, the station was officially closed on 3 April 1946.

The airfield was then transferred to the Ministry of Supply and became the home for the Rocket Propulsion Establishment until the mid-1990s.

The site is now Westcott Venture Park, which is the registered address for 37 companies.

== History ==
=== Second World War ===
RAF Westcott opened in September 1942 along with its satellite station RAF Oakley. The airfield was equipped with 3 concrete runways. Shortly after its opening, No. 11 Operational Training Unit (OTU) moved in from RAF Bassingbourn operating the Vickers Wellington bomber. The OTU played a major part in the training of bomber crews during the Second World War, as part of this training, trainees would be sent on air navigation and leaflet dropping exercises.

During and after the last few days of fighting in May 1945, No. 11 OTU and the airfield were involved in Operation Exodus: repatriation flights for almost 53,000 Allied personnel who had been prisoners of war in Germany.

The RAF moved out in August 1945 and the airfield was transferred to the Ministry of Supply on 3 April 1946.

The following units were also here at some point:

- No. 1 Engine Control and Demonstration Unit
- No. 2 Squadron RAF
- No. 92 Group Servicing Section
- No. 453 Squadron RAAF
- No. 4307 Anti-Aircraft Flight RAF Regiment
- Rocket Propulsion Establishment Gliding Centre

=== 1946-1990s ===
After World War II, rocket research and development took on new urgency after Germany's success with the V-1 and V-2 rocket, the Rocket Propulsion Establishment was set up at Westcott in 1946 and German scientists relocated to the site to continue their research into liquid rocket propellant. The site developed liquid propellant motors for various rockets and missiles, including the Blue Streak ballistic missile and the Europa-1 space rocket launch vehicle. This site was regarded as so secret that it was not marked on Ordnance Survey maps.

In 1977 Westcott and the Waltham Abbey research station merged to form the Propellants, Explosives and Rocket Motor Establishment. Westcott continued to be at the forefront of liquid propellant research until the mid-1990s, developing the LEROS liquid engine used for the Mars missions of the 1990s.

The surviving test stands and control rooms were designated as either Grade II* or Grade II listed building and the K2 stand was named a "nationally unique test stand for the testing of large solid fuel rocket motors which has contributed to significant UK defence systems and the space programme."

== Present day ==
The site, which extends to 650 acres, is now the location of Westcott Venture Park, a business park for light industry. Being the largest business park in Buckinghamshire, it is currently the registered address for 37 companies.

The business park is still home to a division of the Norwegian company Nammo, which continues the design and manufacture of the LEROS rocket engines. Now defunct Reaction Engines Limited began construction on a rocket test facility in 2017 to develop their SABRE rocket engine with the goal of having the new building ready for use in 2020.

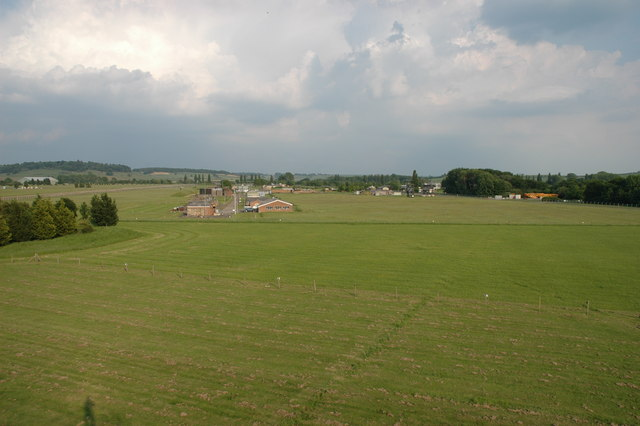
View Across Westcott Venture Park

In 2016, the UK Government announced plans to invest £4.12 million to develop a National Propulsion Test Facility at the site, allowing cost-effective testing and development of propulsion engines. The plan involves building a new vacuum facility which will allow the simulation of high altitude testing of thrusters up to 2 kN, upgrade an existing testing chamber and open a smaller 1N thruster test chamber for the community to use. The European Space Agency will advise and oversee the initial design phase.

Westcott Venture Park has also unveiled plans for a new solar photovoltaic power station in 2018 with a planned capacity of more than 15 megawatts (MW) and will cover 76 acres. This will make the business park carbon-negative since the park will generate more power than the business will use in a year.

== See also ==
- List of former Royal Air Force stations
- List of Royal Air Force Operational Training Units
