= Ickford =

Village in Buckinghamshire, England

Coordinates: 51.760°N 1.059°W

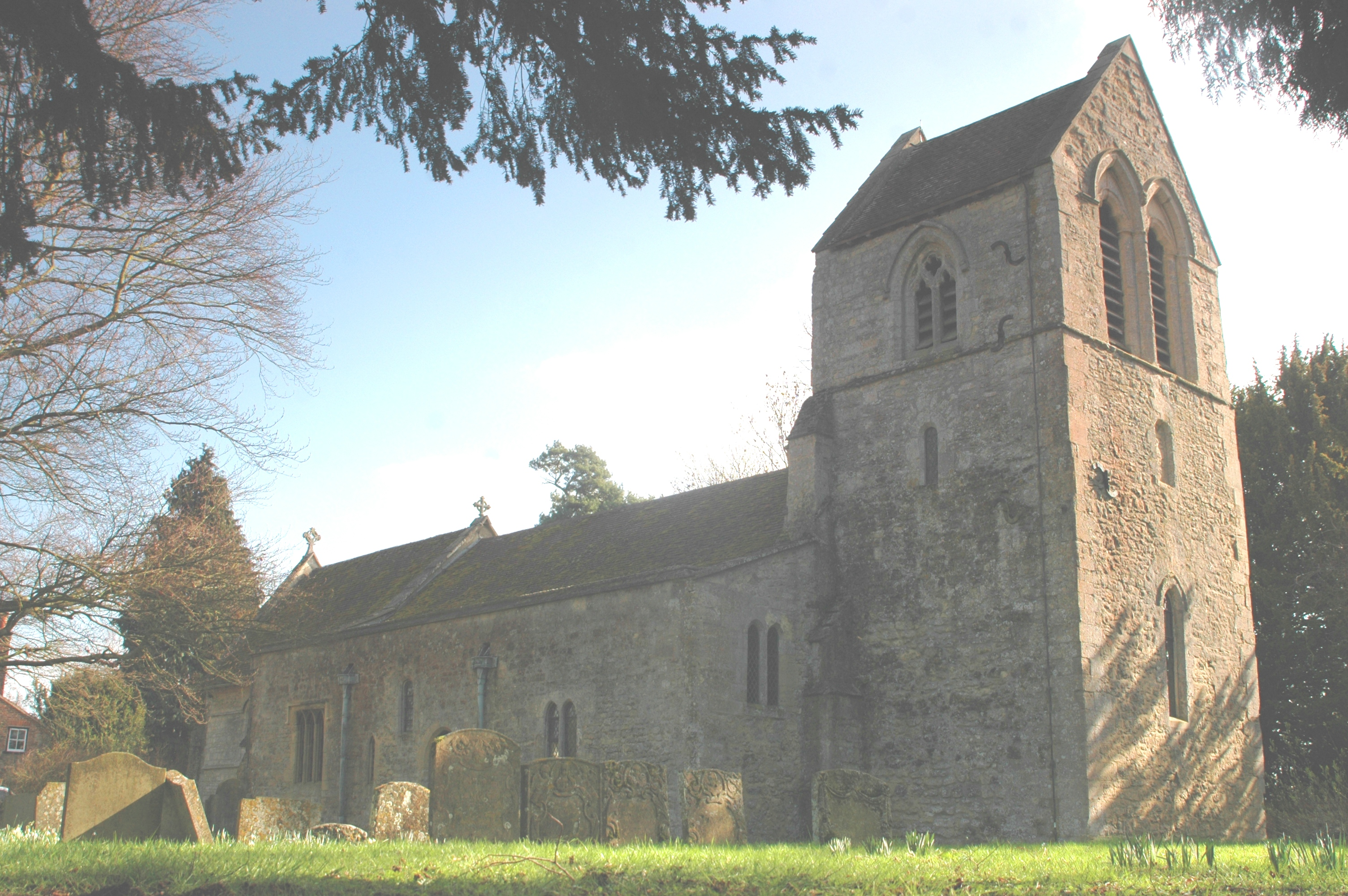
- St. Nicholas' parish church

- Location within Buckinghamshire
- Population: 680 (2011 Census)
- OS grid reference: SP6407
- Civil parish: Ickford
- Unitary authority: Buckinghamshire
- Ceremonial county: Buckinghamshire
- Region: South East
- Country: England
- Sovereign state: United Kingdom
- Post town: Aylesbury
- Postcode district: HP18
- Dialling code: 01844
- Police: Thames Valley
- Fire: Buckinghamshire
- Ambulance: South Central
- UK Parliament: Mid Buckinghamshire
- Website: Ickford parish council

Ickford is a village and civil parish in the unitary authority area of Buckinghamshire, England. It is on the boundary with Oxfordshire, about 4 miles (6.4 km) west of the market town of Thame.

The River Thame forms both the southern boundary of the parish and Ickford's part of the county boundary with Oxfordshire. A stream that is a tributary of the Thame bounds the parish to the west and north.

== Toponym ==
The village toponym is derived from Old English meaning "Icca's ford". The Domesday Book of 1086 records it as Iforde. From the 12th to the 14th centuries it evolved through Ycford, Hicford, Hitford, Ikeford and Ickeforde before later reaching its present form.

== Manors ==
The Domesday Book records that Miles Crispin held four hides of land at Ickford. Crispin was linked with Wallingford Castle, and through him the manor of Ickford became part of the Honour of Wallingford. In the 13th century the Appleton family were the lower lords of this manor. It is not recorded who held this manor before the Norman Conquest of England.

It is recorded that before the Conquest a second manor at Ickford was held by Ulf, a man of Harold Godwinson. The Domesday Book records Robert, Count of Mortain as holding this second manor, with the Benedictine Grestain Abbey as his mesne lord. By 1359 Wilmington Priory in Sussex, an English cell of the abbey, was the mesne lord. By 1377 William de Montacute, 2nd Earl of Salisbury, who had succeeded to some of the de Mortain lands, was Ickford's overlord.

Towards the end of the 12th century Bartholomew de Ickford was the lower lord of one of Ickford's manors, apparently that belonging to Grestain Abbey. By the time his great-grandson John held the manor in 1302–03, the family carried the surname "atte Water". William atte Water died in 1313, by which time the family held both manors and they seem to have been merged.

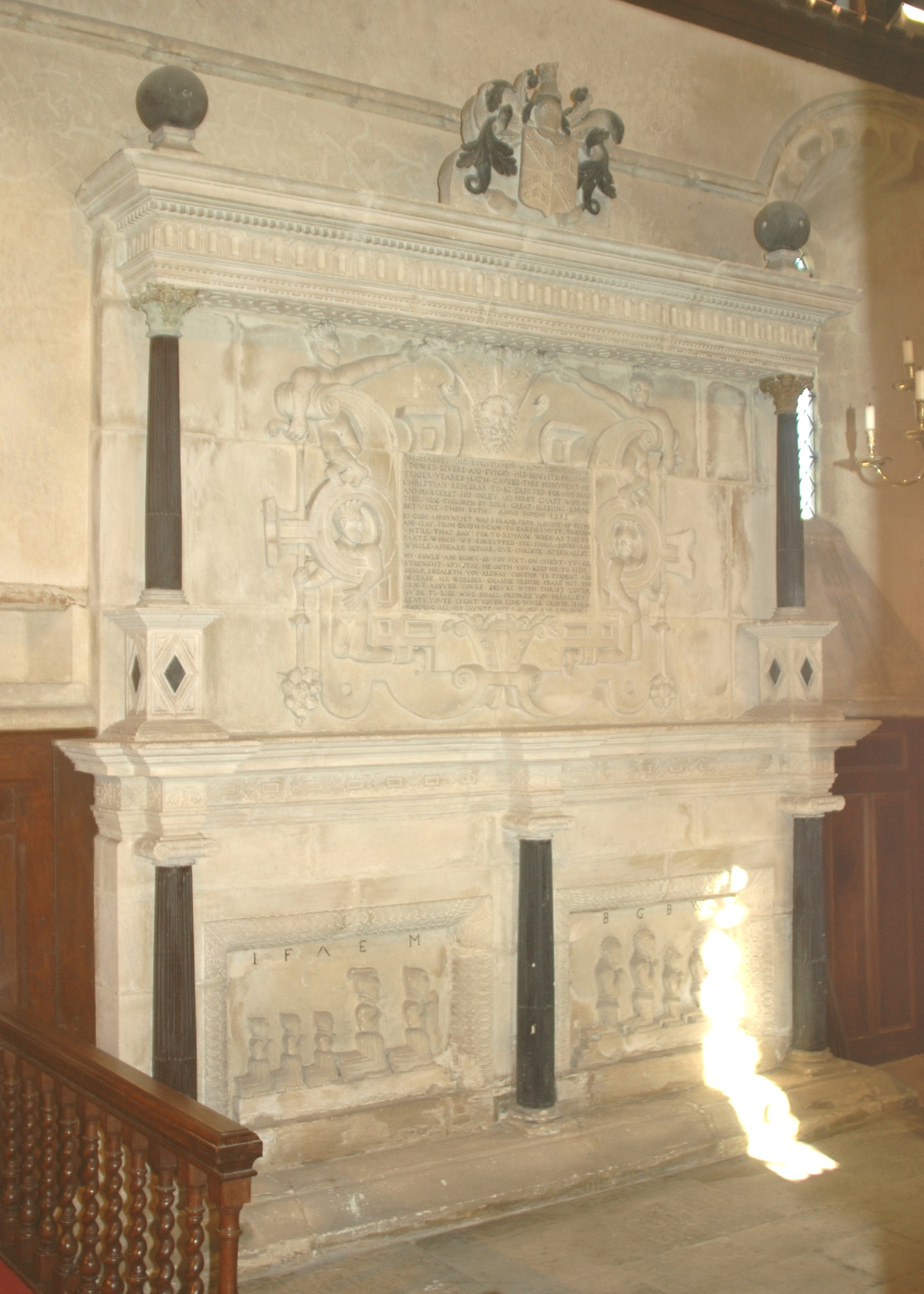
Late-16th- or early-17th-century monument in St Nicholas' parish church to the first Thomas Tipping

Members of the Appleton and Ickford families granted lands at Ickford to Godstow Abbey in Oxfordshire and the Priory of St Frideswide, Oxford. In the 14th century the atte Water family gave land to Bisham Priory in Berkshire. Bradwell Priory also claimed the atte Waters had granted it land at Ickford. In the 16th century the Bisham Priory lands passed to Thomas Tipping, who from 1585 held the "manors of Great and Little Ickford". He died in either 1595 or 1601 and is commemorated by a large monument in the parish church. Thomas's great-grandson Sir Thomas Tipping, who inherited the estate in 1627, was a moderate Parliamentarian in the English Civil War. His son, also Thomas Tipping, inherited the estate in 1693 and was created a baronet in 1698. In 1703 he obtained an Act of Parliament that allowed him to sell the estate.

In Little Ickford, Manor Farm or the New Manor House is a timber-framed building with a 16th-century south range and a 17th-century north block and staircase. The walls of one of the ground floor rooms in the north block has late-17th-century decorative painting now largely concealed behind early-18th-century panelling. The house is a Grade II* listed building.

== Parish church ==
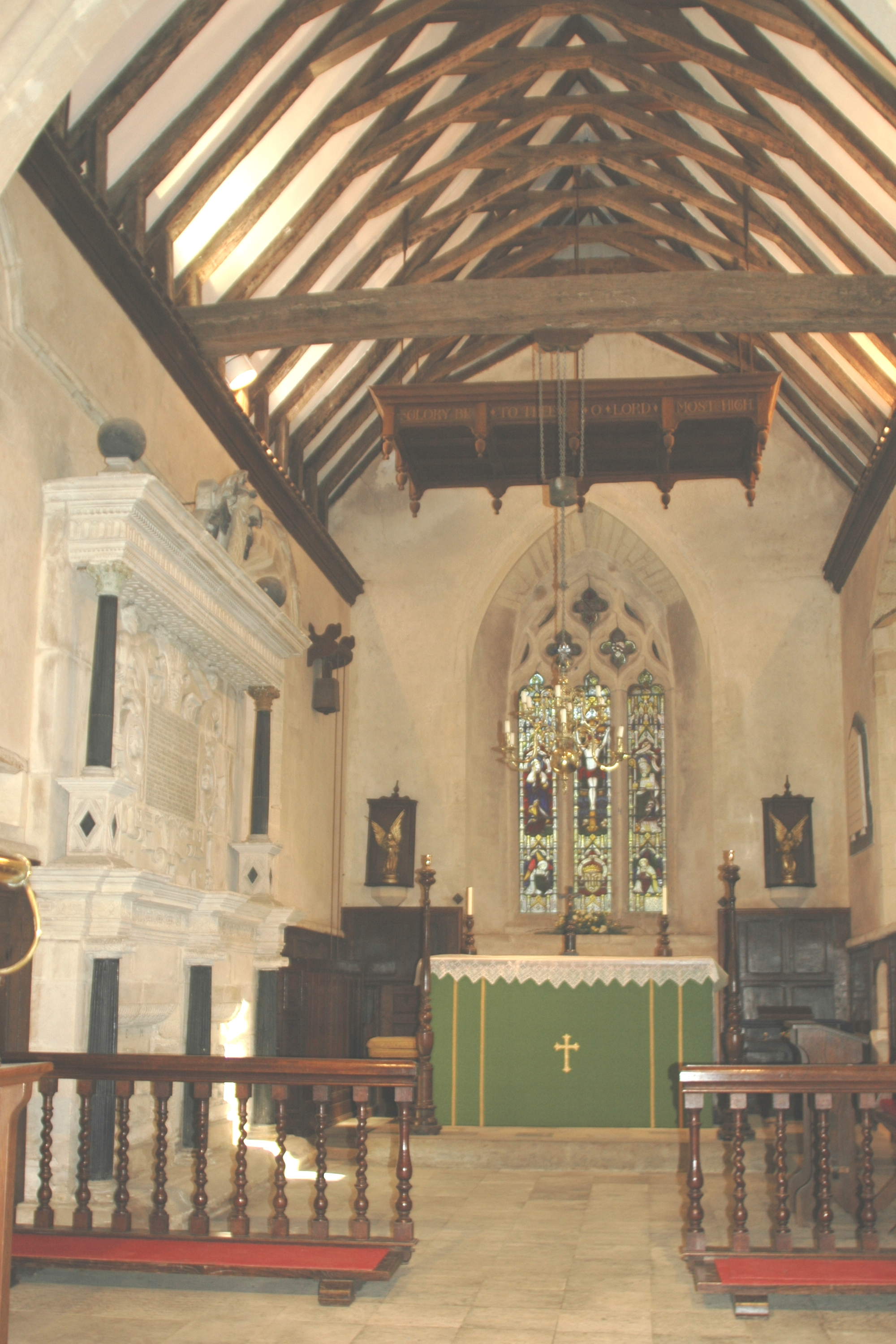
St. Nicholas' chancel, showing 14th-century Decorated Gothic east window with reticulated tracery and 14th-century roof

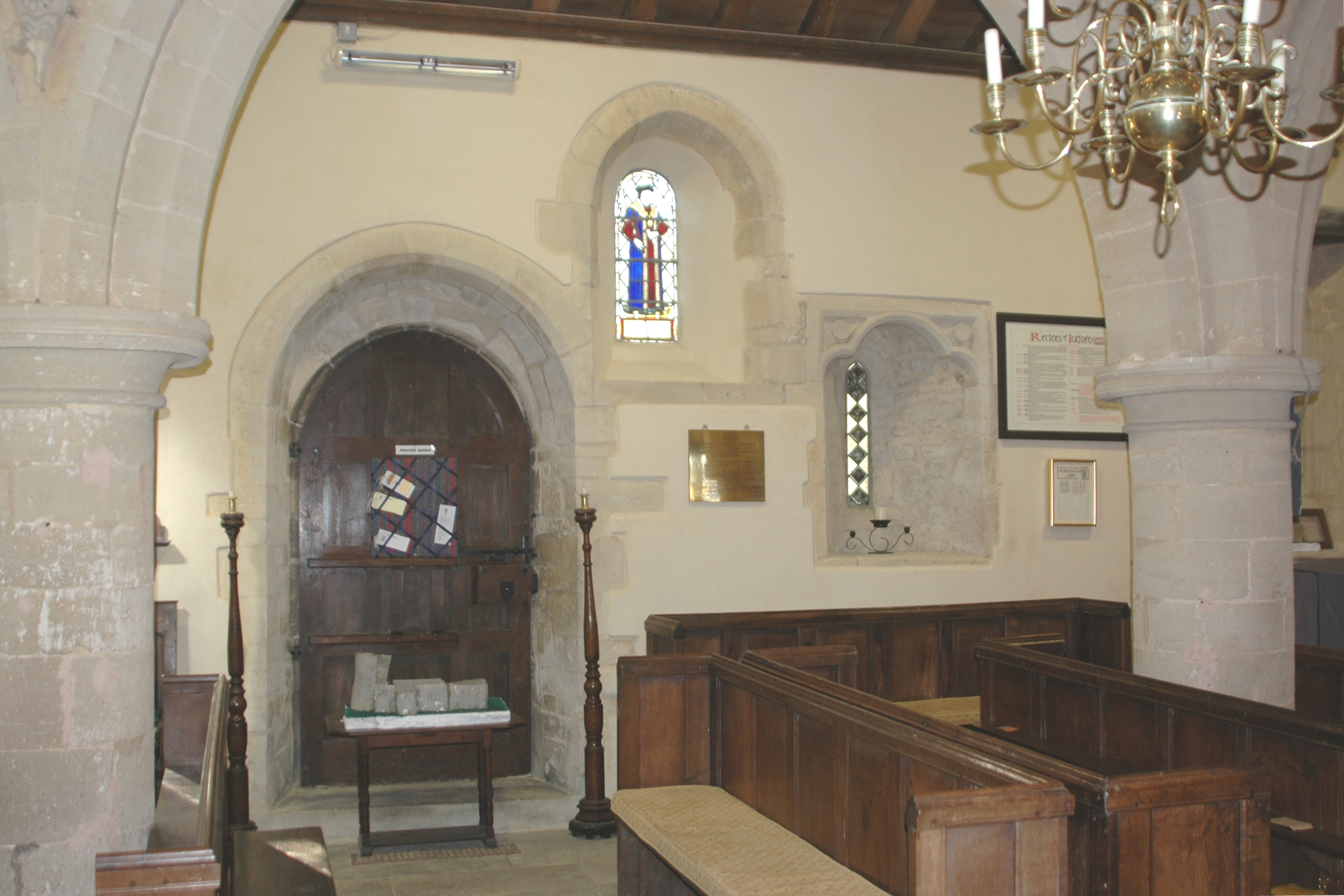
Part of St. Nicholas' north aisle, with lancet windows of different ages and elevations

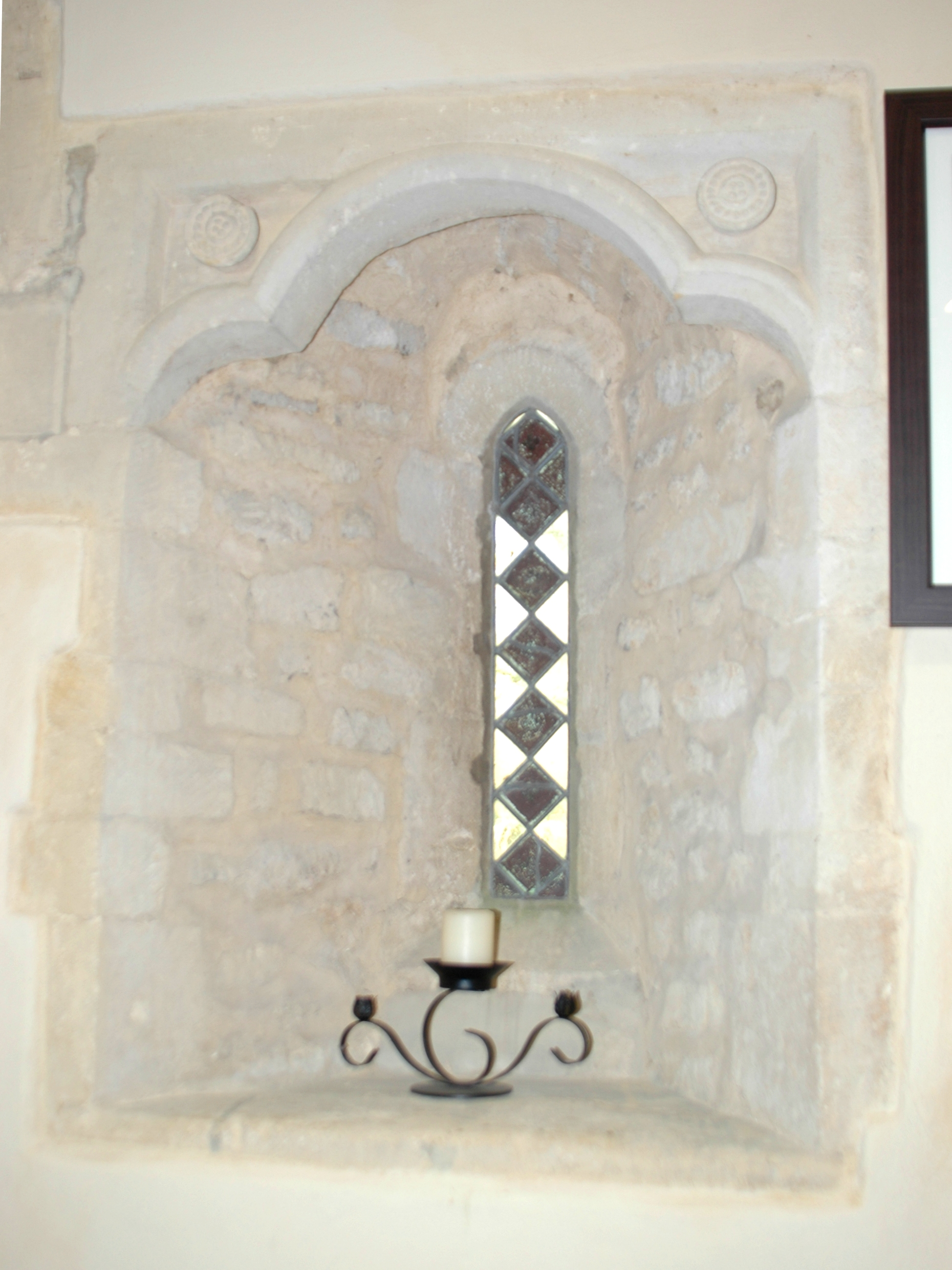
Early English Gothic lancet window in St. Nicholas' north aisle with later cusped rere-arch

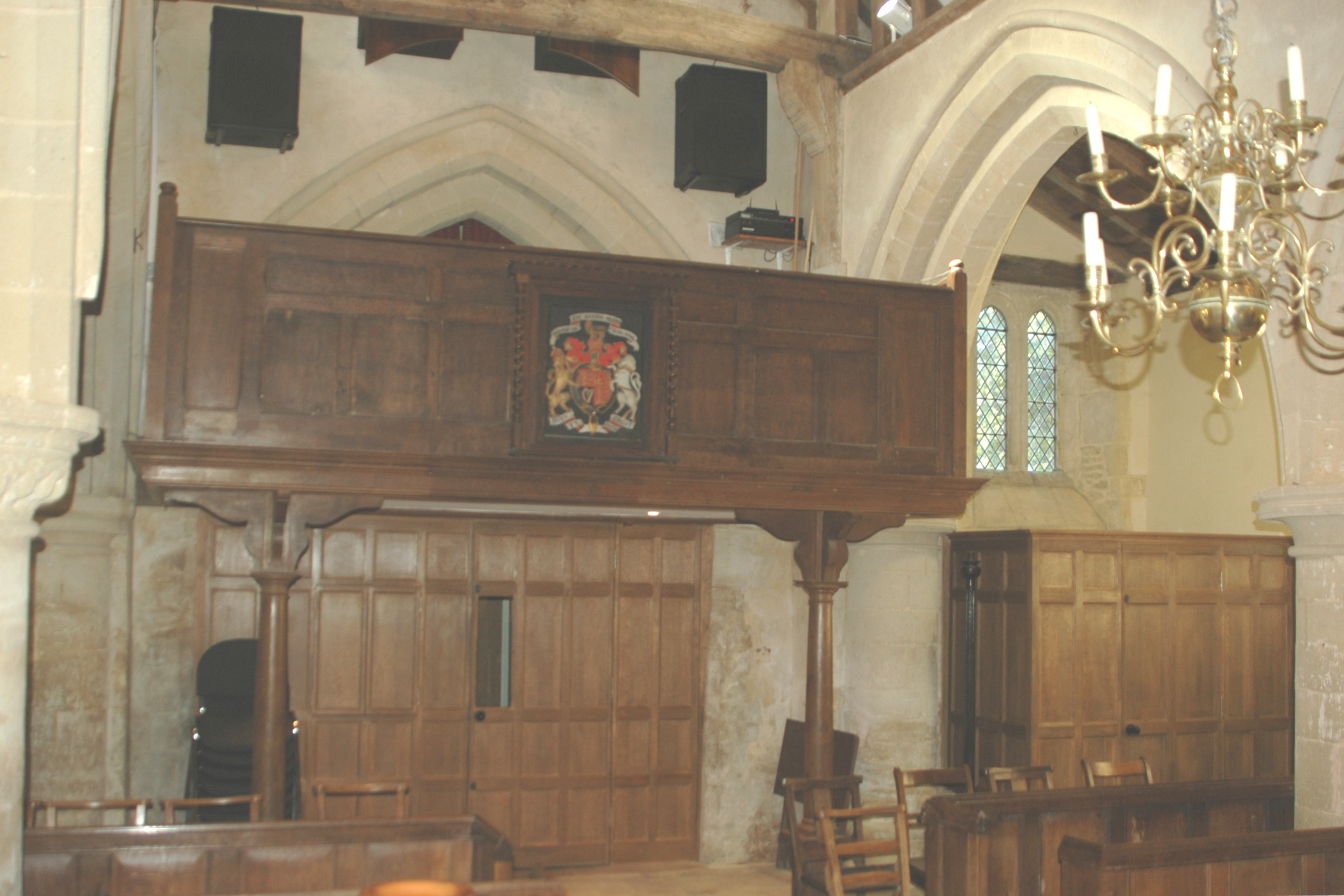
West gallery in St. Nicholas' nave

The Church of England parish church of Saint Nicholas dates from the late 12th or early 13th century. The nave was built in about AD 1210, with a porch in the middle of the south side. Relatively narrow three-bay north and south aisles were added in about 1230, with the south aisle absorbing the original porch and taking the porch's south wall for the limit of its width. The north aisle has one Norman and Early English Gothic 13th-century lancet windows, one of which has a later rere-arch with cusped spandrels, each with a carved rosette.

The chancel has two 13th-century lancet windows in its north wall. Near the westerly of these windows is a rectangular recess that may have been a squint. In its south wall are another lancet window and a 13th-century doorway. The Decorated Gothic east window is 14th-century and has reticulated tracery with ogees. The south wall of the chancel has at its east end a window from about 1350 that is said to have been brought from elsewhere, and towards the west end a 15th-century window with a depressed head. Some of the stained glass windows are 20th-century work by Ninian Comper.

The bell tower is substantially Norman but the upper stages were remodelled in the 14th century. The tower has a saddleback roof.

In the nave some of the seats are 16th-century and there is a west gallery fronted with 17th-century panelling. The pulpit and its tester are also 17th-century.

Restoration work was carried out on the building in 1856, 1875 and 1907. The large stone monument to the first Thomas Tipping used to be in the north aisle, but in 1906 was moved to its present position in the chancel. St. Nicholas' is a Grade I listed building.

The west tower has three bells. The treble was cast in about 1599, possibly by George Appowell of Buckingham. Ellis I Knight of Reading, Berkshire cast the tenor in 1623. George Chandler of Drayton Parslow cast the youngest of the main bells in 1716. There is also a Sanctus bell, cast by William Taylor's Oxford foundry in 1847.

The Puritan minister Calybute Downing held the living of the parish from 1632 but it was then conferred on Gilbert Sheldon in 1636. Sheldon already held the living of Hackney, received that of Oddington, Oxfordshire at about the same time as Ickford, and at some time also that of Newington, Oxfordshire. After the Restoration of the Monarchy, Sheldon was consecrated Archbishop of Canterbury in 1663. St. Nicholas' is now part of the Benefice of Worminghall with Ickford, Oakley and Shabbington.

== Economic and social history ==
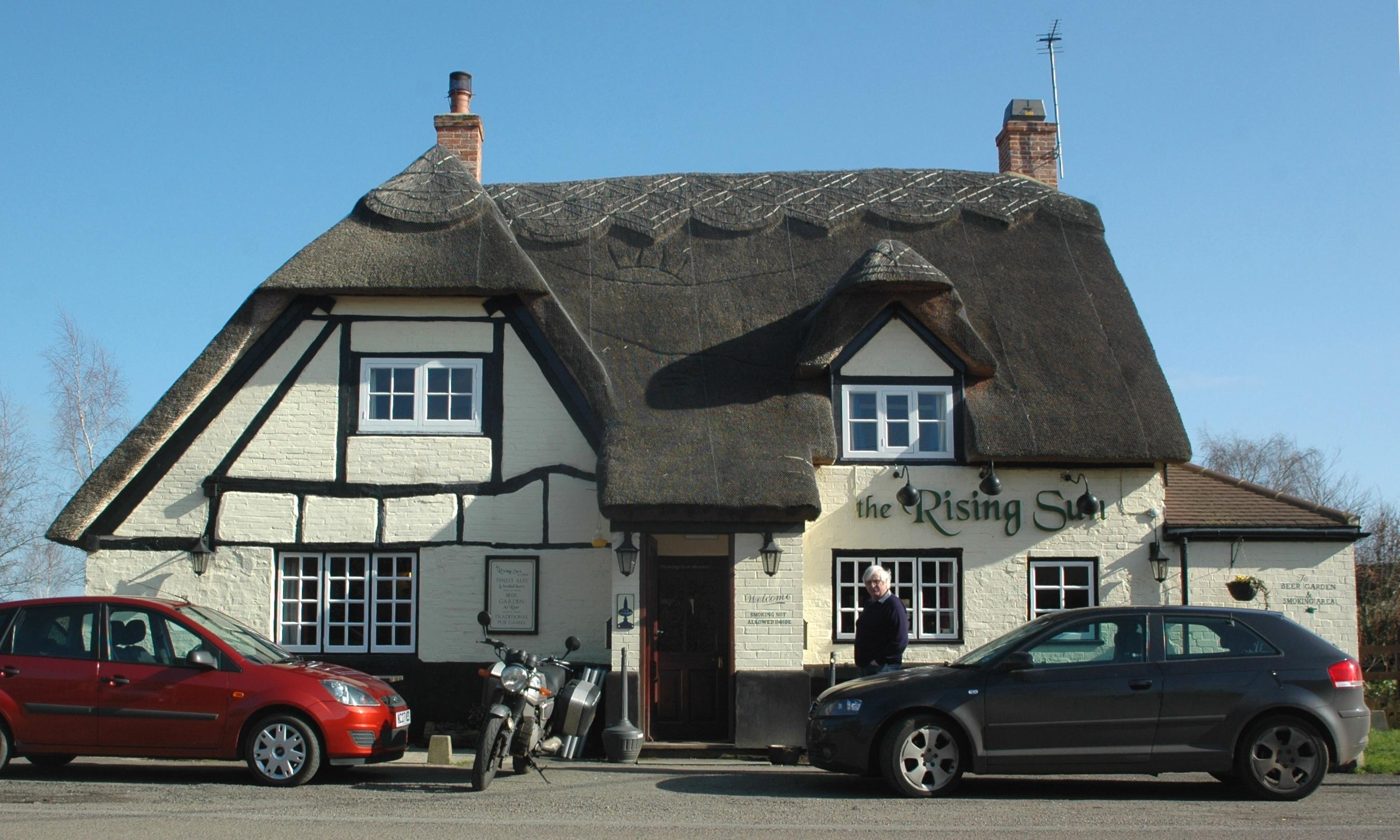
The Rising Sun public house is a 17th-century timber-framed building with brick nogging and a thatched roof.

Ickford had a bridge over the River Thame by 1237, when repairs were ordered with oak from Brill Wood. In that century the bridge was variously recorded as Wodebrugge or Widebrugge. County boundary stones set into the present bridge of three stone arches suggest that it was completed in 1685. The bridge is a scheduled monument.

The recusant dramatic poet William Joyner lived at Ickford in the 17th century.

The village hall was designed by the architects Dale and Son of Oxford and built in 1946. The building is of five bays separated by arches vaulting from the floor. Its extensive roof and almost all of its walls are hung with wooden shingles, possibly in response to the shortage of many types of building material after the Second World War. The hall was built entirely by a small party of volunteers from the parish: an achievement commemorated by a painting over the fireplace in the hall.

== Amenities ==
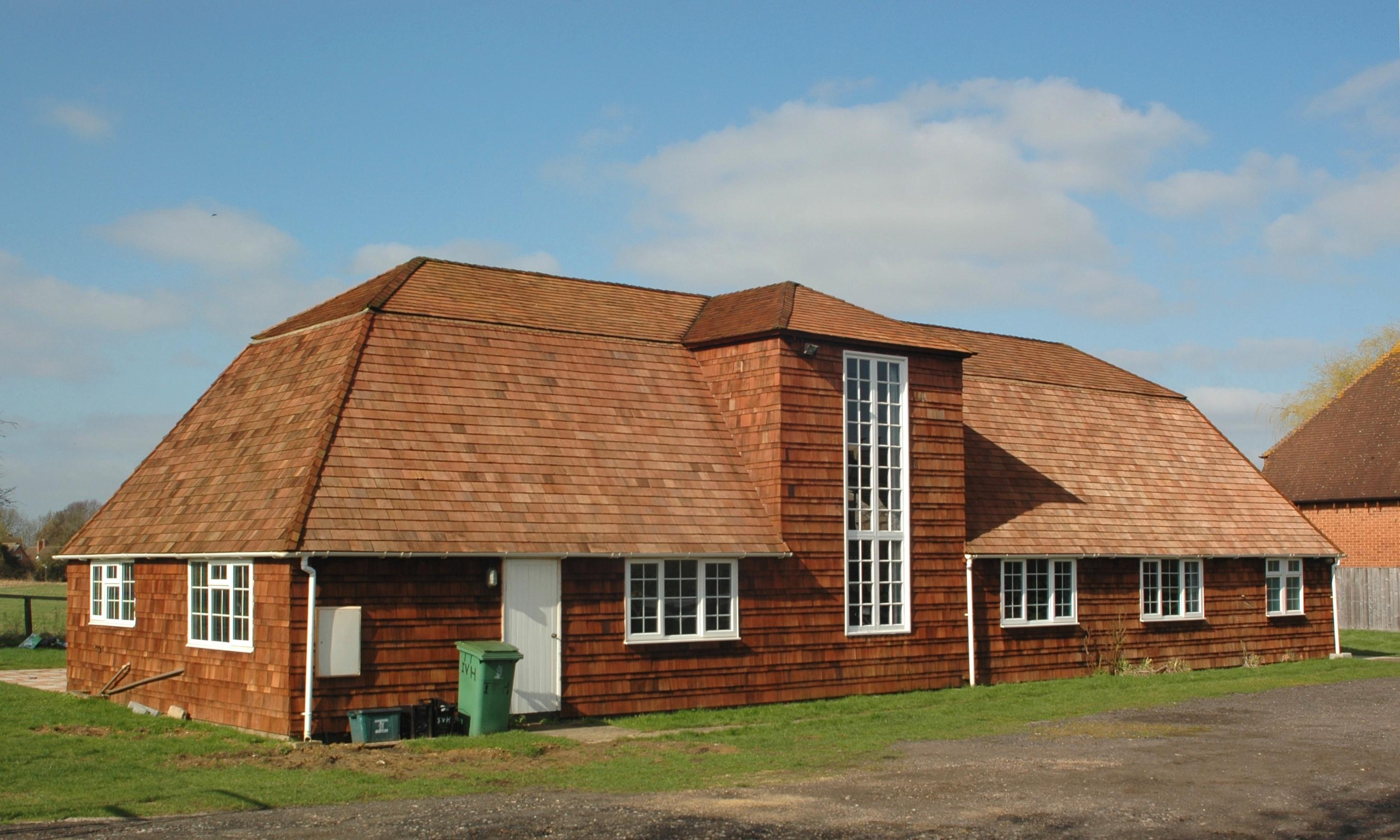
Ickford Village Hall

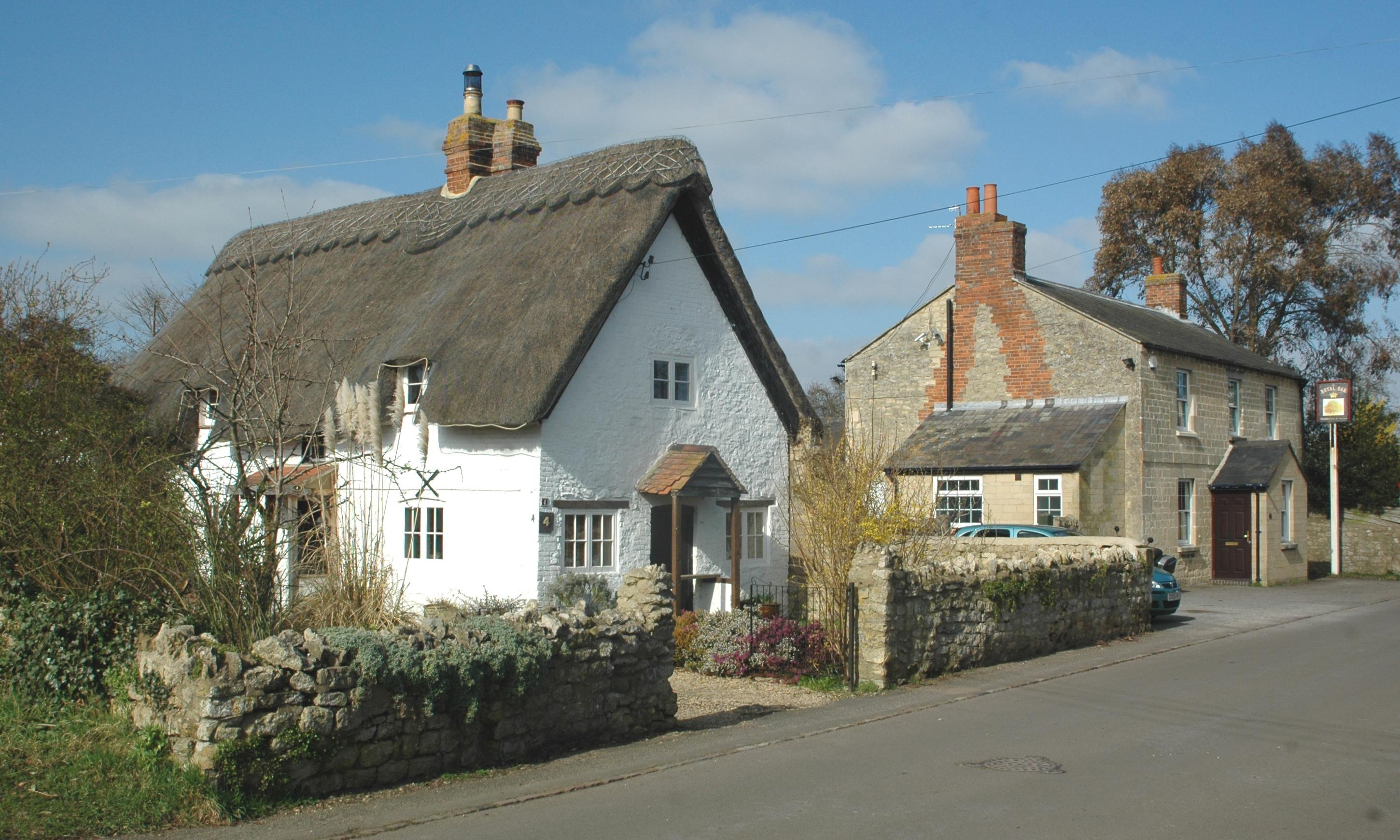
4 Bridge Road is a 17th-century thatched cottage whose front was rebuilt in the 18th century. The stone building in the background is the former Royal Oak public house.

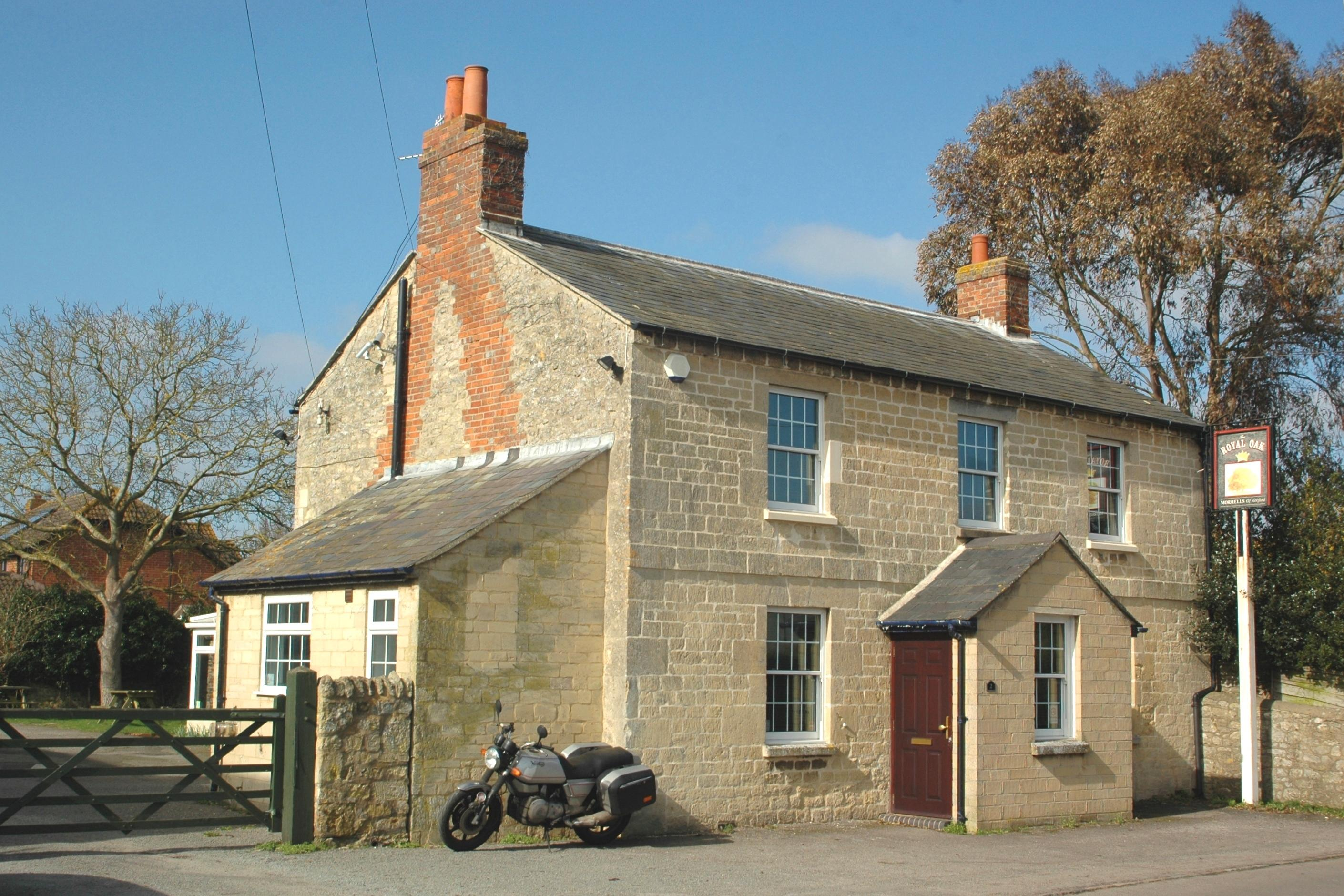
The Royal Oak, a 19th-century building with rubblestone gable walls and an ashlar facade. No longer trading as a public house.

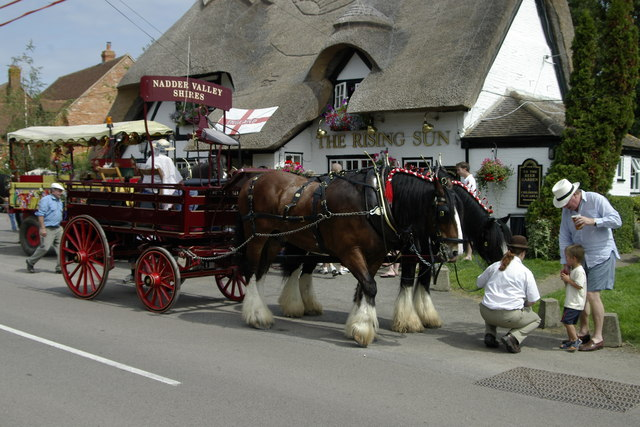
A pair of Shire horses in harness resting outside the Rising Sun in 2004

Ickford has a 15th-century public house, the Rising Sun. A second pub, the Royal Oak, ceased trading in about 2000. Ickford also has a village shop and post office.

Ickford Combined School is a community primary school for children between four and eleven years old and has about 115 pupils. The school also serves the adjoining parishes of Worminghall and Shabbington. The school was opened in September 1906 and has a sports hall, which was opened in February 2006. There is a pre-school and an After School Club at the school.

Much of the parish is agricultural but being close to Oxford and junction 8A of the M40 Ickford is increasingly a commuter village.

For more than 60 years an annual tug of war with neighbouring Tiddington has been held each summer across the River Thame.

== Sources and further reading ==
- Page, William (1927). A History of the County of Buckingham, Volume 4. Victoria County History. pp. 56–61.
- Pevsner, Nikolaus (1960). Buckinghamshire. The Buildings of England. Harmondsworth: Penguin Books. pp. 174–175.
- Reed, Michael (1979). Hoskins, W.G.; Millward, Roy (eds.). The Buckinghamshire Landscape. The Making of the English Landscape. London: Hodder & Stoughton. pp. 46, 190. ISBN 0-340-19044-2.
