= Brill, Buckinghamshire =

Village in England

Coordinates: 51.820°N 1.052°W

Brill
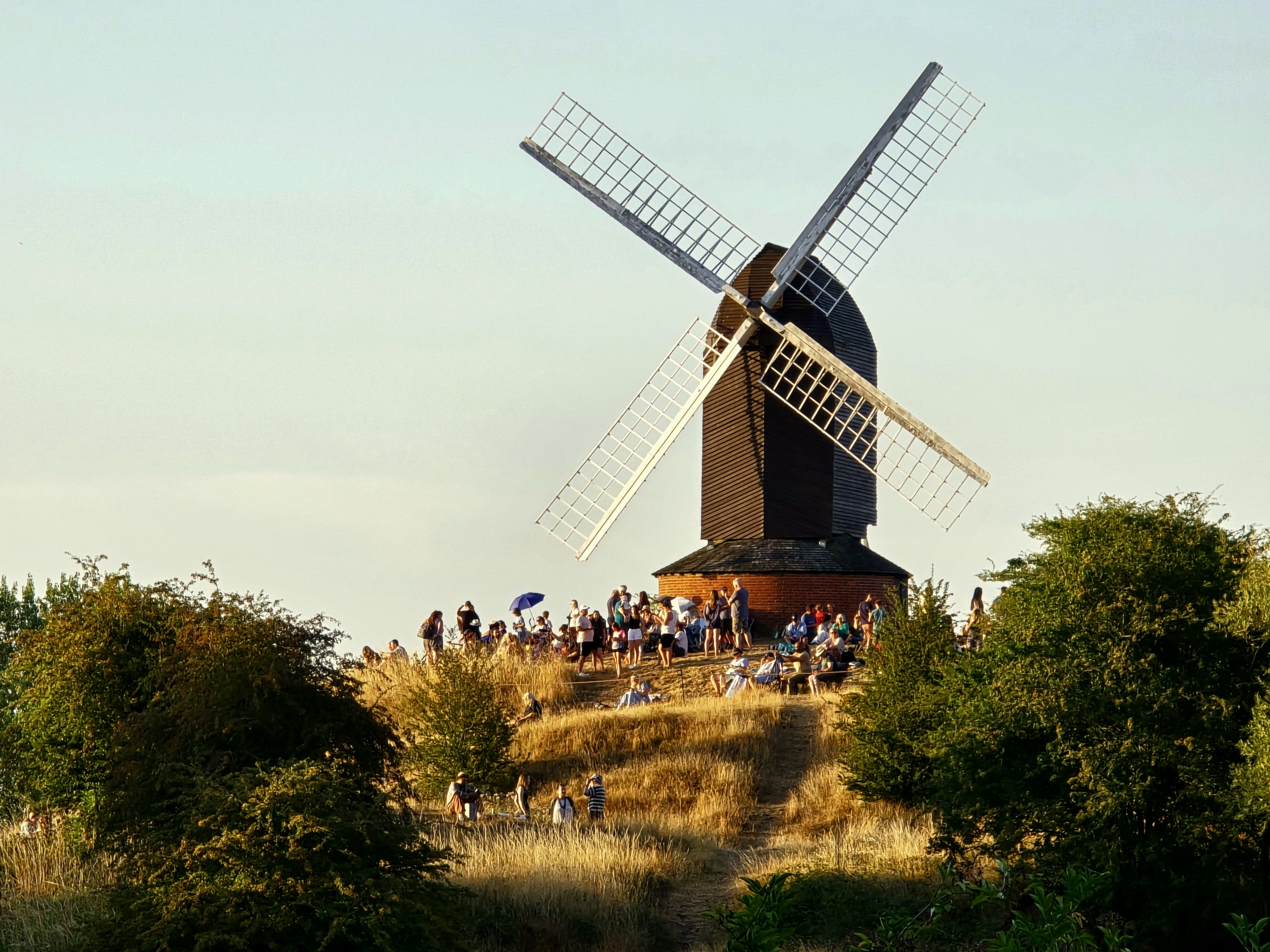
- Brill windmill

- Location within Buckinghamshire
- Population: 1,141 (2011)
- OS grid reference: SP658139
  - London: 46 miles (74 km) SE
- Civil parish: Brill
- Unitary authority: Buckinghamshire
- Ceremonial county: Buckinghamshire
- Region: South East
- Country: England
- Sovereign state: United Kingdom
- Post town: AYLESBURY
- Postcode district: HP18
- Dialling code: 01844
- Police: Thames Valley
- Fire: Buckinghamshire
- Ambulance: South Central
- UK Parliament: Mid Buckinghamshire
- Website: Brill Village

Brill is a small village in rural England, located in the country of Buckinghamshire near the border with Oxfordshire. It lies on elevated ground, which makes it stand out compared to near landscape. The 2011 UK Census recorded about 1,587 residents.

== Toponymy ==
Brill's name is tautological, being a combination of Brythonic and Anglo Saxon words for 'hill' (Brythonic breg and Anglo Saxon hyll). The name attracted the attention of J. R. R. Tolkien, who based the Middle-earth village of Bree upon it.

== Manor ==
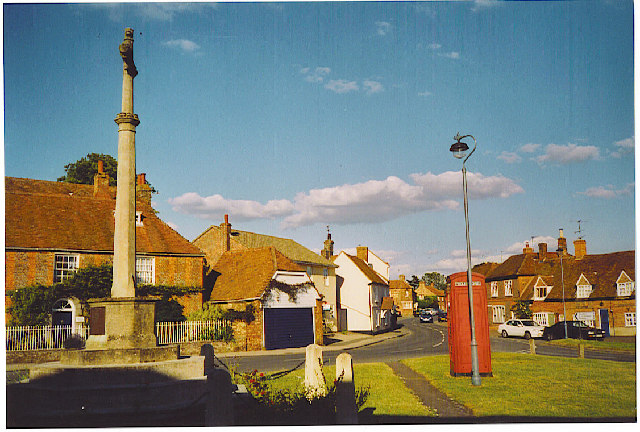
Brill

The manor of Brill was the administration centre for the royal hunting Forest of Bernwood and was for a long time a property of the Crown. King Edward the Confessor had a palace here. There is evidence that Henry II, John, Henry III and Stephen all held court at the palace. It remained in place until the time of Charles I, who turned the building into a Royalist garrison in the English Civil War. This led the Parliamentarian John Hampden to destroy it in 1643.

== Church and priory ==
The Church of England parish church of All Saints was built early in the 12th century, and its nave and chancel remain essentially Norman structures. The chancel's north wall has a blocked lancet window from that period. The pointed chancel arch is 13th century. The Perpendicular Gothic west tower was built early in the 15th century. The present chancel roof dates from the 17th century.

The north aisle was built in 1839 but its east window dates from about 1275. In 1888 All Saints' was largely rebuilt under the direction of John Oldrid Scott. Scott extended the chancel eastwards by about 6 feet (1.8 m) and added a new Gothic Revival east window. He added the south aisle and porch at the same time but its east and west windows are re-used Perpendicular Gothic ones, probably dating from early in the 16th century.

All Saints was a chapel of ease to the nearby parish of Oakley from the 12th until the 16th century. It belonged to the Priory of St Frideswide, Oxford until the Dissolution of the Monasteries.

Brill had a hermitage or priory dedicated to St. Werburgh that was annexed to Chetwode Priory from 1251. Chetwode Priory surrendered the advowson of the hermitage to the Bishop of Lincoln in 1460.

== Brill windmill ==
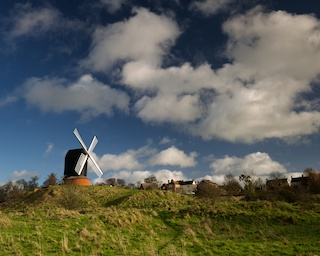

Brill is also known for its windmill, last owned and used by the Pointer and Nixie family who also baked bread in their house in the village. With timbers dating from 1685, Brill Windmill provides one of the earliest and best preserved examples of a post mill (the earliest type of European windmill) in the UK. Management and ownership of the Grade II* listed mill was passed to Buckinghamshire County Council in 1947 who, through a number of major interventions, have ensured that the mill still stands today. In 1967 the Council installed a structural steel framework that helps to support the mill's ancient timber frame but means that the mill is static and can no longer turn to face the wind.

=== Restoration project ===
By the 2000s water ingress and weathering had caused timber decay to the extent that the structure's integrity was described as "At risk". The Brill Windmill Management Group was established in 2007 to help plan a restoration project and to seek the necessary funds. With funding from English Heritage and WREN, full repair and preservation work was completed by July 2009. The mill is now structurally sound and once again open to the public, once a week, between March and September.

== Brill tramway ==
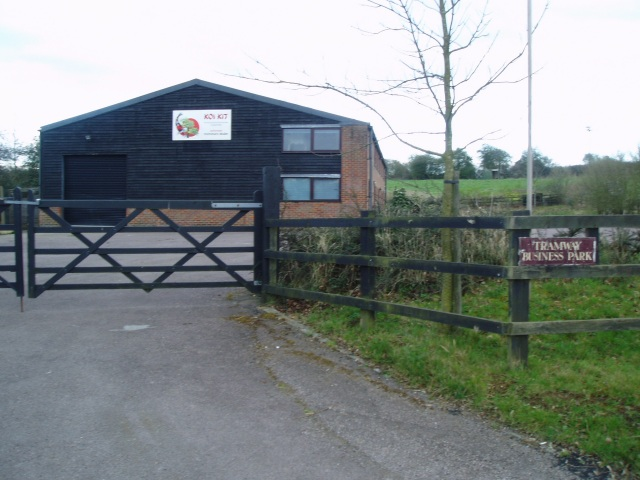
Site of the former Brill Tramway terminus

Brill railway station was once a north-western terminus of the London Underground system.

After the completion in 1868 of the Aylesbury and Buckingham Railway, the Duke of Buckingham built the light railway to provide freight access by rail to his estates at Wotton Underwood. The extension to Brill gave access to a brickworks there. The line was opened in 1871, and following public demand passenger facilities were provided early in 1872. Originally known as the Brill Tramway, the line's name changed to "Oxford and Aylesbury Tramroad" when a company was formed in an abortive attempt to extend the line to Oxford; the biggest hindering expense was the cost of tunnelling under Brill Hill.

The original Quainton Road station was north of the Quainton–Waddesdon road, and wagons from the Brill line reached it by means of a wagon turntable; there was no direct access. When the Metropolitan Railway took over the line in 1896, it doubled the main line from Aylesbury and re-sited the station to its present position, replacing a level crossing with the present road over bridge; a running connection between the Brill line and the main line was constructed at that time. In 1935, on the creation of the LPTB, control was transferred to it from the Metropolitan and Great Central Joint Committee which had taken it over in 1906; the whole branch was closed on 30 November 1935.

== Little London ==
The hamlet of Little London to the south was part of Brill parish until 1934, when Buckinghamshire County Council moved the parish boundary and transferred the hamlet to Oakley.

== Amenities ==
Brill Church of England Combined School is a mixed, voluntary controlled, Church of England primary school. It takes children from the age of four through to the age of eleven. The school has about 175 pupils.

== Notable people ==
- Thomas Edwards, recipient of the Victoria Cross for actions at the Battle of Tamai during the Mahdist War, was born in the village.
- James Govier (1910–1974), a British painter, etcher, and engraver, produced images of Brill church and windmill, along with images of Buckinghamshire. Govier's family originated from Brill and the adjoining parish of Oakley, and he was born in Oakley. Examples of Govier's work can be seen at the County Museum in Aylesbury and at the Ashmolean Museum in Oxford.
- The perpetrators of the Great Train Robbery of 1963 hid at the remote Leatherslade Farm on Brill's boundary with the village of Oakley.
- Mick Pointer, drummer and founding member of the progressive rock bands Marillion and Arena, was born on 22 July 1956 in Brill.
- Thomas Belson, one of the Oxford Martyrs, was born in Brill on an unknown date (circa 1560). He was found guilty of assisting Roman Catholic priests, and was executed with his companions at Oxford on 5 July 1589. He was beatified in 1987.
- Gavin Free, a slow-motion cinematographer, is from Brill. He is a producer of content for popular Internet group Rooster Teeth as a member of the Achievement Hunter cast, and founded the successful YouTube channel "The Slow Mo Guys", which has over 1 billion views.

== References in literature ==
- Referring to the Otmoor riots:

I went to Noke
And nobody spoke.
I went to Brill,
They were silent still.
I went to Thame,
It was just the same.
I went to Beckley,
They spoke directly.

- There is a rhyme about "Brill on the hill":

At Brill on the hill
The wind blows shrill
The cook no meat can dress
At Stow-in-the-Wold
The wind blows cold
I know no more than this.

- Another rhyme ran: "Brill on the hill, Oakley in the hole, dirty Ickford and stinking Worminghall".
- Edward Lear makes reference to Brill in More Nonsense Pictures, Rhymes, Botany, etc. (1872):

"There was an old person of Brill,
Who purchased a shirt with a frill;
But they said, 'Don't you wish,
You mayn't look like a fish,
You obsequious old person of Brill?'"

- The name and various other features of Brill were used by J. R. R. Tolkien as the basis for the village of Bree in The Lord of the Rings. He also used other nearby places in Oxfordshire as part of the Shire, sometimes using the same names, such as Buckland.
- John Betjeman rejoiced that the long arm of Metro-land was halted before impinging on "the remote hilltop village of Brill".

== Sources and further reading ==
- Mitchell, V; Smith, K (2006). Aylesbury to Rugby, including the Brill Branch. Midland Main Lines. Middleton Press. pp. 24–48. ISBN 1-904474-91-8.
- Oppitz, Leslie (2000). "A tramway built for a Duke". Lost Railways of the Chilterns. Newbury: Countryside Books. pp. 73–82. ISBN 1-85306-643-5.
- Page, W.H., ed. (1927). A History of the County of Buckingham, Volume 4. Victoria County History. pp. 14–19.
- Pevsner, Nikolaus (1973) [1966]. Buckinghamshire. The Buildings of England. Harmondsworth: Penguin Books. pp. 72–73. ISBN 0-14-071019-1.
- Reed, Michael (1979). Hoskins, W.G.; Millward, Roy (eds.). The Buckinghamshire Landscape. The Making of the English Landscape. London: Hodder & Stoughton. pp. 28, 61, 63, 74, 76, 96, 114, 122, 127, 135, 147, 159, 167, 195–197, 267. ISBN 0-340-19044-2.
