= James Charles Cox =

James Charles Cox F.R.C.S. F.R.S.
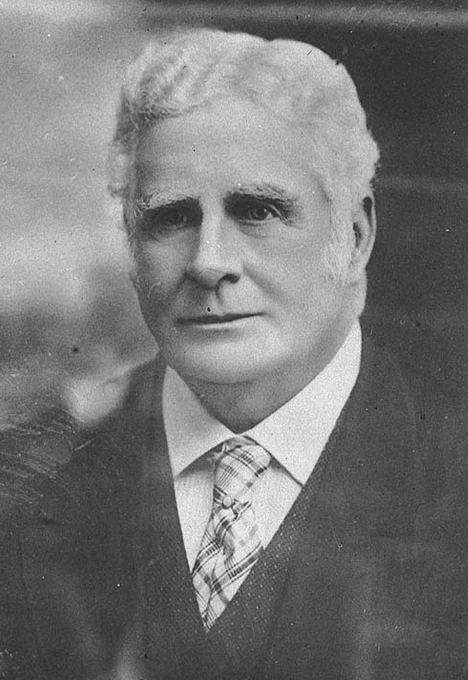
- Dr. Cox, c. 1910
- Born: 21 July 1834; Mulgoa, New South Wales
- Died: 29 September 1912 (aged 78); Mosman, New South Wales
- Education: The King's School; University of Edinburgh
- Spouses: Margaret Wharton MacClennan (m. 1858; died 1876) Mary Frances Benson (m. 1878; died 1902) Emma Sarah Gibbes (m. 1903)
- Parent(s): Edward Cox; Jane Maria Brooks
- Relatives: Edward King Cox (brother); William Cox (grandfather); Alfred Cox (uncle)

James Charles Cox (21 July 1834 – 29 September 1912) was an Australian physician and conchologist.

== Early life ==
Cox was born at Mulgoa, southwest of Sydney. He was a son of Jane Maria (née Brooks) Cox and Edward Cox of Fernhill in Mulgoa. Among his siblings was Edward King Cox, who was appointed to the New South Wales Legislative Council, and Richard William Cox, a prominent sheep grazer. His father was a non-elective member of the New South Wales Legislative Council.

His paternal grandparents were Rebecca (née Upjohn) Cox and William Cox, an English soldier and pioneer. His uncle was Alfred Cox, a large landowner and member of the New Zealand House of Representatives.

As a child, he played with Aboriginal children and learned from them about native birds and animals. He was educated at the local parish school and the King's School, Parramatta. He was apprenticed to be a physician for three years and learned dispensing at the Sydney Infirmary, acted as a clinical clerk, assisted at post mortems and was present at one of the first operations using chloroform in 1852.

== Career ==
He became an assistant to Professor John Smith, the foundation professor of chemistry and experimental physics at the University of Sydney at its original site near Hyde Park, now occupied by Sydney Grammar School and established what became the Sydney Museum next door. He earned an M.D. in 1857 presenting the thesis "On the icterus neonatorum" and F.R.C.S. in 1858 at the University of Edinburgh. He was registered as a medical practitioner in New South Wales in February 1859 and developed a lucrative private practice in Sydney.

Cox retained an interest in nature all his life. He was elected a fellow of the Royal Society of New South Wales (then the Philosophical Society) in 1859. He was first president of the New South Wales Board of Fisheries and first secretary of the Entomological Society (later the Linnean Society of New South Wales), both in 1862. He was elected a fellow of the Linnean Society of London in 1868. He was a trustee of the Sydney Museum and left it his collection of land shells. His wrote extensively in the journals of these societies on the conchology of Australia and Melanesia.

He retained a lifelong interest in history, being a foundation member of the Australian Historical Society in 1901 and the first President of the Australasian Pioneers Society in 1910. He was also a member of the Australian Club for over 50 years and was known for his after-dinner speeches on the early days of Sydney.

== Personal life ==
He married Margaret Wharton MacClennan (c. 1840–1876), the third daughter of John MacClennan, in September 1858. They eventually had four sons and six daughters, including:

- James Wharton Cox (1859–1911), also a physician.
- Oswald MacClennan Cox (1860–1864), who died young.
- Millicent Emma Cox (1862–1931), who married Montague Bertie, 12th Earl of Lindsey, the only son of Montague Bertie, 11th Earl of Lindsey, in 1890.
- Allaster Edward Cox (1864–1908), a graduate from the University of Edinburgh Medical School in 1889; he was a Lt. in the Australian Light Horse Regiment.
- Arthur Brooks Cox (1866–1924), a dental surgeon who married Laura Richmond Campbell (1868–1954), a daughter of Alexander Campbell of Rosemont, in 1894.
- Constance Margaret Cox (1868-1940), who married Charles Alison, founder of Wyong, New South Wales, and moved to England where they died.
- Elinor Mary Cox (1870-1949), who married William Martins Le Poer Trench, a son of Col. Hon. William Le Poer Trench and grandson of William Trench, 3rd Earl of Clancarty, in 1891. After his death, she married her late husband's cousin, Hon. Sydney Trench, a son of Hon. Frederic Sydney Charles Trench (heir apparent to the 2nd Lord Ashtown) and Lady Anne Le Poer Trench (eldest daughter of the 3rd Earl of Clancarty), in 1905. After his death a month later, she married, thirdly, to Brig.-Gen. Ronald Campbell Maclachlan in 1908; Maclachlan was killed in action in 1917 during World War I.
- Margaret May Cox (1874–1935), who married Archibald J.C. Galletly, manager of the Bank of Montreal in British Columbia, in 1905.
- Maria Lilian Cox (1876–1959), who married Lestock Frederick Reid Livingstone-Learmonth, son of Somerville Livingstone-Learmonth and grandson of Thomas Livingstone Learmonth, in 1898.
- Jane Judith Cox (1876–1954)

After the death of Cox's first wife in 1876, he married Mary Frances Benson (1850–1902), a daughter of Frances Maria Benson and William Benson, in 1878. Mary died in 1902 and he married Emma Sarah Gibbes (1869–1955), the widow of William Charles Valentine Gibbes, at St. Philip's Church in August 1903. Together, they were the parents of one daughter Laurel Lilian Cox (1910-1978).

Cox died on 29 September 1912 in the Sydney suburb of Mosman.

=== Descendants ===
Through his daughter Millicent, he was a grandfather of Lady Muriel Felicia Vere Bertie (d. 1981) who married Henry Liddell-Grainger in 1922, with whom she had several children, including David Liddell-Grainger; after Henry's death, Lady Muriel married Sir Malcolm Barclay-Harvey, the 22nd Governor of South Australia, in 1938.

He was the ancestor to Allaster Edward Cox, Australia's High Commissioner to Brunei Darussalam from 2001 to 2004, who received an audience with Crown Prince Al-Muhtadee Billah.

== Bibliography ==
Cox's publications include:

- (1864) Catalogue of the Specimens of the Australian Land Shells in the collection of J. C. Cox. John Alex. Engel, Sydney.
- (1868) A Monograph of Australian Land Shells ... Illustrated by XVIII plates. William Maddock, Sydney.
- (1905) An Alphabetical List of the Fishes Protected Under the Fisheries Act of 1902.
- (1909) Alphabetical List of Australian Land Shells.
