= Marie Horseman =

Australian artist (1911–1974)

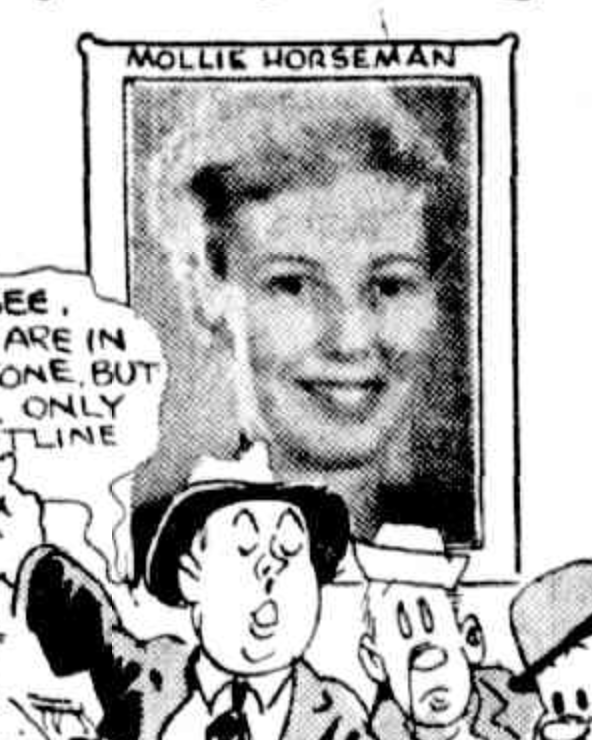
- Born: Marie Compston Horseman; 9 December 1911; Rochester, Victoria, Australia
- Died: 7 May 1974 (aged 62); Katoomba, New South Wales, Australia
- Resting place: Mulgoa
- Writing career
- Pen name: Mollie Horseman, Vanessa
- Period: 1929–1974

Marie Compston "Mollie" Horseman (9 December 1911 – 7 May 1974), was an Australian comic book artist, book illustrator and fashion artist. Horseman is most notable for her work on the 1950s comic strips, "Pam" and "The Clothes Horse".

== Biography ==
Marie Horseman was born in Rochester, Victoria on 9 December 1911, the daughter of Frederick Ernest Horseman (1882-1966), a farmer, and his wife Katherine Marie Compston (née Miller), who were migrants from Yorkshire, England. In 1924, when she was thirteen, her parents separated and Horseman travelled with her mother to England before moving to Germany. Horseman's mother managed a canteen for the British Army, whilst Horseman attended a German finishing school. Her parents didn't officially divorce until October 1933.

On returning to Australia she was briefly employed by Norman Lindsay and his second wife, Rose, as a governess, for their two daughters. Lindsay was impressed with her drawing skills and recommended she attend the National Art School. For financial reasons, she did not complete her course at East Sydney Technical College but during her studies she was influenced by Rayner Hoff's artistic style.

In 1929 Horseman together with Joan Morrison became the first female cartoonists to be permanent employees at Smith's Weekly.

Horseman married William Longford Power, an articled clerk, on 2 September 1931 at the North Sydney registry office. They had one son, Roderick Packenham, before they divorced in May 1938.

Horseman then married Nelson Illingworth, grandson of the sculptor Nelson Illingworth on 8 June 1938 at the Mosman Presbyterian Church. They had one son and three daughters before the marriage ended in divorce. In the early 1940s the family moved to Brisbane, where Horseman freelanced, drawing comic strips for Frank Johnson Publications as well as contributing cartoons to Man Magazine, Australian Woman's Mirror and Rydge's Business Journal (for whom she created "The Tipple Twins").

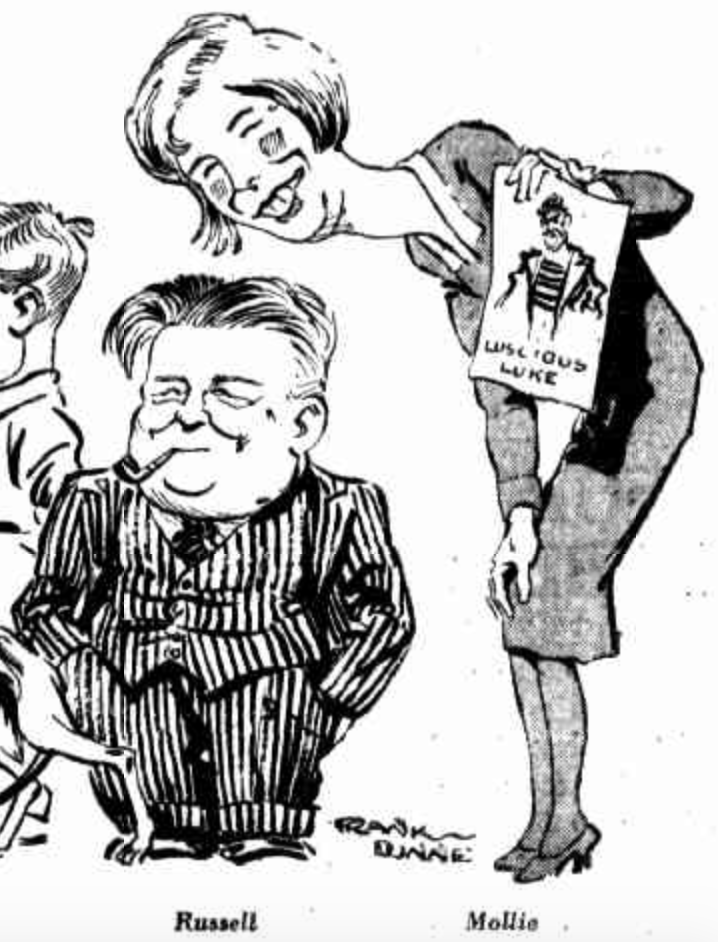
Smith Weekly cartoonists Jim Russell & Mollie Horseman, 1932

From 1946 she worked for The Courier-Mail at the paper's Sydney Production Unit in York Street. Following the suicide of cartoonist, Jean Cullen, Horseman took responsibility for Cullen's new comic strip, "Pam" in the Sunday Mail and "The Clothes Horse" in The Sydney Morning Herald. "Pam" became Horseman's best-known work, running for over eleven years and becoming widely syndicated.

In 1957 she moved to Avalon, a northern beachside suburb of Sydney, with her five children, where she remained until 1967.

During the early 1960s Horseman was a contributor to Everybody's. Her illustrations (either anonymous or signed "Vanessa") included a weekly full-page colour cartoon of the "Sexy Man" type and the serial Girl Crusoe (1964), a parody of the popular 'good girl cheesecake' comic. In 1963 Everybody's hailed her (somewhat inaccurately) as 'Australia's only woman cartoonist', although she was definitely the best known.

Between 1967 and 1969 she returned to Brisbane, where she illustrated books for Jacaranda Press. She then moved to the Blue Mountains in New South Wales, continuing to undertake freelance work and painting landscapes. She was hit by a car in 1973, which led to a stroke paralysing her right hand. As a result, she taught herself to draw with her left hand.

Horseman died at the age of sixty-two in the Blue Mountains Hospital, Katoomba on 7 May 1974, and was buried at St Thomas's Church in Mulgoa.

== Publications ==
- Cook, Violet Ethel; Horseman, Mollie (Illus.) (1939). Peat Fires. John Sands Pty. Ltd.
- Horseman, Mollie (Illus.) (1949). Nursery rhymes. Jacaranda Press. ISBN 978-0-7016-0296-3.
- Horseman, Mollie (Illus.) (1967). The Lost Boomerang. Jacaranda Press. ISBN 978-07016-7016-0.
- Thomson, Andrew Kilpatrick; Horseman, Mollie, (Illus.) (1968). The Four Corners : an Anthology of Poetry. Jacaranda Press. ISBN 978-0-7016-0104-1.
- Horseman, Mollie (Illus.) (1969). Let us Read B. Jacaranda Press. ISBN 978-0-7016-7034-4.
- Walker, Kath; Horseman, Mollie (Illus.) (1970). My People. Brisbane, Qld: Jacaranda Press. ISBN 978-0-7016-0356-4.
- Horseman, Mollie (Illus.) (1970). A Story for Miss Prince. Jacaranda Press. ISBN 978-0-7016-7030-6.
- Horseman, Mollie (Illus.) (1971). The Magic Car. Jacaranda Press. ISBN 978-0-7016-7014-6.
