= Cox's Cottage =

- Location within Sydney Location within Australia
- 33°49′31″S 150°39′24″E
- Location: 2 St Thomas Road, Mulgoa, City of Penrith, New South Wales, Australia

History
- Built: 1810–1811

Site notes
- Architectural style: Colonial Georgian
- Owner: Department of Planning

New South Wales Heritage Register
- Official name: Cox's Cottage; Mulgoa Cottage; The Cottage; Coxs Cottage; Fern Hill; Estate of Mulgoa
- Type: State heritage (landscape)
- Designated: 2 April 1999
- Reference no.: 171
- Type: Homestead Complex
- Category: Farming and Grazing
- Builders: James King (supervisor)

Cox's Cottage is a heritage-listed pasturing land and residence located at 2 St Thomas Road in the outer western Sydney suburb of Mulgoa, New South Wales, Australia. It was built from 1810 to 1811 by James King. It is also known as Mulgoa Cottage; The Cottage, Coxs Cottage, and was formally known as Fern Hill and Estate of Mulgoa before the new house was built. The property remains privately owned and is the oldest house in Australia still in residence. It was added to the New South Wales State Heritage Register on 2 April 1999.

== History ==
=== Aboriginal land ===
The traditional owners of the land now occupied by Cox's Cottage were the Mulgowie people, a group of Aboriginal Australians who became known as the "Mulgoa tribe".

There is a reference to an attack on the Cox property by Aboriginal people in 1814.

=== Colonisation ===
Cox's Cottage is part of early colonial land grants and purchases to members of the Cox family in the Mulgoa Valley, south of Penrith, eventually totalling some 1,520 hectares (3,760 acres). The first of these grants, of 12 hectares (30 acres), made in 1809 to the infant Edward Cox and confirmed by Governor Macquarie the following year, became known as "Fernhills" or Fernhill.

Edward's father, Lieutenant William Cox, is perhaps best known for supervising the construction of the first road over the Blue Mountains in the second half of 1814. Lt. William Cox sailed to New South Wales on the Minerva in 1799. During his 37 years of residence in the early colony, he made a substantial and enduring contribution to its progress in the fields of public administration, building and agricultural development. The Cox family were remarkable "house and garden" people. During the middle years of the 19th century, William Cox Sr. was at Clarendon, near Windsor; his eldest son William, lived at Hobartville, Richmond; his sons Henry, George and Edward were to build and occupy their respective houses of Glenmore, Winbourne and Fernhill at Mulgoa. Another son, James, settled in Van Dieman's Land, where he built his own magnificent Clarendon. Around all these houses the Cox families created beautiful gardens.

The Cottage/Mulgoa Cottage or Fernhill was built for Lt. William Cox under the supervision of James King, a retired sergeant of the New South Wales Corps, on land granted to the infant Edward Cox in 1809–10. Surveyor James Meehan apparently sighted boundaries for neighbouring grants from "Mr Cox's house" in July 1811, and the earliest part of the house - (verandah-less, with jerkin-head gables, intact in the roof space today) - may date from this time. The house noted by Meehan, probably built c. 1810–11, is most likely to have been the building known as The Cottage or Cox's Cottage. The farm was well established by 1815 when Mrs Cox prepared for the visit of Governor Macquarie with "an excellent cold collation". For some time James King, a servant of the Cox family, managed their Mulgoa properties from the site of The Cottage, with the occasional help of William Cox's fourth, fifth and seventh sons, George, Henry and Edward.

Between 1821 and 1825 George and Henry Cox lived in turn at The Cottage with their new wives before moving to their own houses in the Mulgoa area. At about this time The Cottage was extended from a simple three room house with jerkin head gabled roof by the addition of another room, at the western end, and an encircling verandah. Adding a verandah was an innovation of architectural significance: the former vernacular English weatherboard box became a colonial bungalow. The cottage was the nucleus of the Mulgoa Settlement and was also the site of religious gatherings before the construction of St. Thomas' Anglican Church nearby.

About 1825 Edward Cox, who had been only four years old when he was granted the land, returned from schooling in England. In 1827, at the age of 22, he married Jane Maria Brooks and they lived at The Cottage for the next sixteen years.

By the late 1830s Fernhill, including The Cottage and Lot 2 was described as one of the five principal estates in the Mulgoa Valley. In 1843 Edward Cox built and moved into a much grander Greek Revival style house, Fernhill, on the hill to the west of The Cottage on the western side of Mulgoa Road. Apparently designed as a two-storey building but built as single storey, possibly by colonial architect Mortimer Lewis, Fernhill was not finished, possibly as a result of the economic recession of the 1840s.

Perhaps also as a result of the recession The Cottage and 162 hectares (400 acres) of land were put up for lease. At this time the property was described as:

'A commodious and convenient Family Cottage in the Vale of Mulgoa, containing dining (9 by 5 metres (30 by 17 ft)), drawing, five bedrooms and a large cellar with every description of convenient out-offices - an established well stocked orchard and garden.'

— The Sydney Morning Herald, 7 July 1845, p.3

In 1847 a medal was won by Edward Cox for wines produced on his property, Fernhill, competing against his brother and neighbour Henry at Glenmore also at Mulgoa and Sir John Jamison at Regentville. Competition in 1847 for the West Cumberland Agricultural Society (now Royal Agricultural Society of NSW) medal for the production of the best wine, was keen. The magnificent 9-centimetre (3.5 in) diameter, 156-gram (5.5 oz) medal by Richard Lamb is a reflection on the status of the prize, possibly engraved by the colony's leading exponent Samuel Clayton, then living close by at Windsor. A case could be made for this medal being amongst the earliest and possibly the grandest of all surviving New South Wales agricultural medals and one of the great objects of Australian silver.

Historical archaeologist Judy Birmingham has listed the literature on wine making that would have been available to the early European settlers of the colony, including William Macarthur's comprehensive Letters on the culture of the vine (1844). She cites William Cox's vineyard at Mulgoa as being planted in 'deep trenches, and their parallel lines can still often be seen clearly as "crop marks". The vineyard terracing on Lot 2 was very evident in 1983 when the Mulgoa Valley Regional Environmental Study was prepared and is still obvious today. It is likely that the vines that produced the medal winning wine in 1847 were grown on Lot 2, since terraces have not been identified on the property now known as Fernhill to the west of Lot 2.

In the early 1850s Colonel Godfrey Mundy, aide-de-camp to Governor Fitzroy singled out Fernhill for the way in which the Cox family had manipulated the landscape by removing or thinning eucalypts and retaining the local angophoras, which had more of the appearance of English trees.

Edward Cox died in 1863 and the property passed to his oldest son Edward King Cox (1829–1883) of Rawden, Mudgee, who until 1885 operated a noted racehorse stud at The Cottage, producing several famous horses including 1880 Melbourne Cup winner Grand Flaneur. In late 1982 the once-fenced gravesites of Grand Flaneur and famous sire, Yattendon, were no longer evident. The stables behind The Cottage were still evident in 1917.

Following the death of Edward King Cox, his third son, Alfred Edward Cox and a J. Blaikie formed a partnership and ran a dairy on the property during the period c. 1897 to 1913.

=== After the Cox family ===
In 1913 the property was sold to Fowler and Baylis of Penrith, then to a Mr Max Lam for a short time. In 1920 it was purchased by H. J. Davey. Mrs Davey and J. Love had a short partnership, then Mrs Davey and Mrs Love ran the dairy farm until about 1969, when Mrs Davey retired to a fibro house she had built to the west of The Cottage. The Cottage was then leased to a Mr Sheehan until 1972.

=== Rescue and revival ===
The Cottage endured years of neglect with the inevitable consequence of the serious deterioration of its fabric. An important step was taken when Miss Valerie Cox made a donation to the National Trust of Australia (NSW): payment was made for the eradication of termites and the boarding up of its windows. The house thus was given some protection, but unfortunately the stone verandah flagging was removed shortly before Mr. Broadbent purchased the house.

The Cottage has been owned by James Broadbent and his family since the 1970s. Dr James Broadbent is a noted architectural and landscape historian who has preserved the house and reconstructed/ recreated the garden to retain the significance of the building and its setting. Broadbent has embarked on a lengthy scheme of restoration. His plan was to work from the outside in: therefore his attention was given firstly to the repair of the verandah and roof.

Beautifully sited on a small rise near Mulgoa Creek, The Cottage is one of the earliest and most important colonial houses, and still retains its fine rural setting. It formed the nucleus of the Mulgoa settlement. It is perhaps the oldest weatherboard house in New South Wales, in proportion and roofline being one of the first early colonial bungalows. It is the oldest building in the Mulgoa/Wallacia Valley, and the oldest surviving of the numerous Cox family houses.

== Description ==
=== Cox's Cottage ===
Cox's Cottage, dating from 1810 or 1811, is probably the oldest inhabited residence in Australia (other earlier surviving domiciles are now typically run as museums). It is probably also the oldest weatherboard cottage in New South Wales. The cottage is an early colonial bungalow which retains its rural setting and remnants of its original garden (including white cedar trees (Melia azedarach var.australasica) and the striking succulent "century plants" (Agave americana), both documented as growing here in the mid 19th century). Post 1980 plantings include a number of species typical of Cumberland Plain colonial gardens, such as bunya-bunya pine (Araucaria bidwillii) and silky oak (Grevillea robusta). It has a rectangular, asymmetrical plan with double pitched roof. Appears to have reached present form by 1820. It was originally shingled but this was replaced c. 1850 by zinc coated roofing tiles.

The original SHR listing for Cox's Cottage included two ten hectare lots of land, Lots 3 and 4 DP 241971. The Cottage is located on the northern end of Lot 3 and a contemporary home with associated outhouses has been built on Lot 4 DP 241971 to the north and out of sight from the cottage. Mulgoa Creek runs from north to south near the eastern boundary of both Lots 3 and 4. Most of the 20 hectares comprising Lots 3 and 4 is pastoral in appearance.

The Cottage is oriented to the north-east and positioned at the end of its ridge (a pattern of development through the immediate area) with views along the creek to the north and over the river flats.

The still intact historical and visual relationships between Cox's Cottage, St Thomas's Church to the south and Fernhill to the west are important.

==== Lot 2 ====
Lot 2 DP 241971 is an undeveloped lot of 10 hectares (25 acres) adjacent to Cox's Cottage to the north, with its narrow western end fronting onto Mulgoa Road. It is L-shaped and extends to the north along the river flats on its eastern boundary.

The block generally slopes from Mulgoa Road to the creek with a small rise of saddle near the road. The site features two small dams located on the natural watercourse along the northern boundary which are fed by rain and not by a watercourse.

Two areas of former vineyard terraces are still evident. Vegetation on the cleared lower flats and the flat area east of Mulgoa Road is mainly pasture species with agricultural weeds including St John's Wort and blackberry in places. Along Mulgoa Creek are remnant native trees interspersed with mature exotic species including English and Japanese elms and privet. Vegetation elsewhere is mostly regenerating rough-barked apple oak (Angophora sp. - e.g. A.intermedia, A.floribunda) and stands of Acacia sp.

=== Condition ===
As at 28 November 2007, the property is considered likely to contain archaeological evidence relating to the Cox family period of occupation of the area, including possible building sites and orchard locations, for example:

- Site of early buildings - large area of ridge to south of the cottage with signs of former buildings from farm and possibly race horse stud;
- Site of clay pits, c. 1810 - distinct impression in ground in gully to west of cottage; source of bricks for house;
- Site of the vineyard, c. 1810 - distinct impression of many terraces over wide area on slope;
- Site of dam/weir, c. 19th century - possibly marked by vertical timber piling;
- Site of former house, c. 1792 - marked by surviving fruit trees;
- Possible site of former horse graves, c. 1880s - no visible remains of graves of "Yattendon" and 'Grand Flaneur'.

=== Modifications and dates ===
Cox's Cottage was almost derelict when bought by historian and conservator James Broadbent and his family in the 1970s. He has spent decades carefully conserving the building and its landscape following Burra Charter principles.

== Heritage listing ==
As at 21 May 2010, Cox's Cottage or The Cottage, dating from 1810, is of State significance as one of the oldest weatherboard-clad dwellings in NSW and probably the oldest occupied residence in the country. Located on the early land grant made to the influential Cox family in the Mulgoa Valley, Cox's Cottage is historically significant and rare at a State level for retaining the original pastoral landscape of its immediate surrounds, providing evidence of colonial settlement patterns in the western part of the Cumberland Plain and of early attempts at farming and viticulture in the Sydney region.

The property has historical associational significance at a State level through several generations of the Cox family, who were important in the development of agricultural and pastoral industries in the colony of NSW, including William Cox, who supervised the construction of the first road over the Blue Mountains. The house is of State aesthetic significance as a relatively intact early Colonial Georgian cottage and its surrounding fields are also of State significance for providing an intact pastoral landscape setting for the Cottage.

Cox's Cottage is of social significance at a State level for the esteem in which it is held by heritage organisations and other community groups. Cox's Cottage has research potential at a State level for the tangible evidence of its early nineteenth century heritage fabric including the Cottage building itself and the former vineyard terracing on Lot 2 dating from the first half of the 19th century. The property is considered likely to contain other archaeological evidence relating to the Cox family period of occupation of the area, including possible building sites and orchard locations.

Cox's Cottage has rarity significance at a State level as an integral part of one of the most significant cultural landscapes in NSW, namely the Mulgoa Valley landscape which is also associated with Fernhill and St Thomas' Anglican Church. This is a designed landscape which includes historic and existing visual links between the three properties and which demonstrates attempts by early European settlers to manipulate the native vegetation to achieve a particular design outcome. Cox's Cottage is also of State significance as representative of early colonial homesteads and cultural landscapes associated with early farming practices in the western part of the Cumberland Plain.

Cox's Cottage was listed on the New South Wales State Heritage Register on 2 April 1999 having satisfied the following criteria.

The place is important in demonstrating the course, or pattern, of cultural or natural history in New South Wales.

Cox's Cottage or The Cottage, dating from 1810, is of State significance as one of the oldest weatherboard-clad dwellings in NSW and probably the oldest occupied residence in the country. Located on the early land grant made to the influential Cox family in the Mulgoa Valley, Cox's Cottage is historically significant and rare at a State level for retaining the original pastoral landscape of its immediate surrounds, providing evidence of colonial settlement patterns in the western part of the Cumberland Plain and of early attempts at farming and viticulture in the Sydney region.

The place has a strong or special association with a person, or group of persons, of importance of cultural or natural history of New South Wales's history.

The property has historical associational significance at a State level through its strong associations with several generations of the Cox family, who were important in the development of agricultural and pastoral industries in the colony of NSW, including William Cox, who supervised the first road over the Blue Mountains. William and other members of the Cox family were instrumental in developing the Mulgoa Valley and the houses they erected include some of the most significant surviving colonial residences in NSW. The land is considered to have historical associational significance at a State level.

The place is important in demonstrating aesthetic characteristics and/or a high degree of creative or technical achievement in New South Wales.

The house is of State aesthetic significance as a relatively intact colonial cottage, thought to be the oldest weatherboard-clad dwelling in Australia and probably the oldest occupied residence in the country. Its surrounding fields are also of State significance for providing an intact pastoral landscape setting for The Cottage. This cultural landscape remains substantially intact unlike the settings of many other colonial homesteads on the Cumberland Plain. The land also has potential local natural heritage significance since it includes remnant riparian vegetation (albeit with a species composition that includes a number of exotic species, including weeds), that is part of a wildlife corridor along Mulgoa Creek which may be the last of western Sydney's waterways to remain in a natural, largely undisturbed state.

The place has a strong or special association with a particular community or cultural group in New South Wales for social, cultural or spiritual reasons.

Cox's Cottage is of social significance at a State level for the esteem in which it is held by heritage organisations and other community groups including the Australian Garden History Society and National Trust of Australia (NSW)) as well as the locally based Mulgoa Progress Association and Mulgoa Valley Landcare Group.

The place has potential to yield information that will contribute to an understanding of the cultural or natural history of New South Wales.

Cox's Cottage has research potential at a State level for the tangible evidence of its early nineteenth century heritage fabric including The Cottage and the former vineyard terracing on Lot 2 dating from the first half of the 19th century. The property is considered likely to contain other archaeological evidence relating to the Cox family period of occupation of the area, including possible building sites and orchard locations.

The place possesses uncommon, rare or endangered aspects of the cultural or natural history of New South Wales.

Cox's Cottage has rarity value at a State level as an integral part of one of the most significant cultural landscapes in NSW, namely the Mulgoa Valley landscape which is also associated with Fernhill and St Thomas' Anglican Church. This is a designed landscape which includes historic and existing visual links between the three properties and which demonstrates attempts by early European settlers to manipulate the native vegetation to achieve a particular design outcome.

The place is important in demonstrating the principal characteristics of a class of cultural or natural places/environments in New South Wales.

Cox's Cottage is of State significance as representative of early colonial homesteads and cultural landscapes associated with early farming practices in the western part of the Cumberland Plain.

== See also ==
- List of heritage houses in Sydney
