= Grand Flaneur =

Australian-bred Thoroughbred racehorse

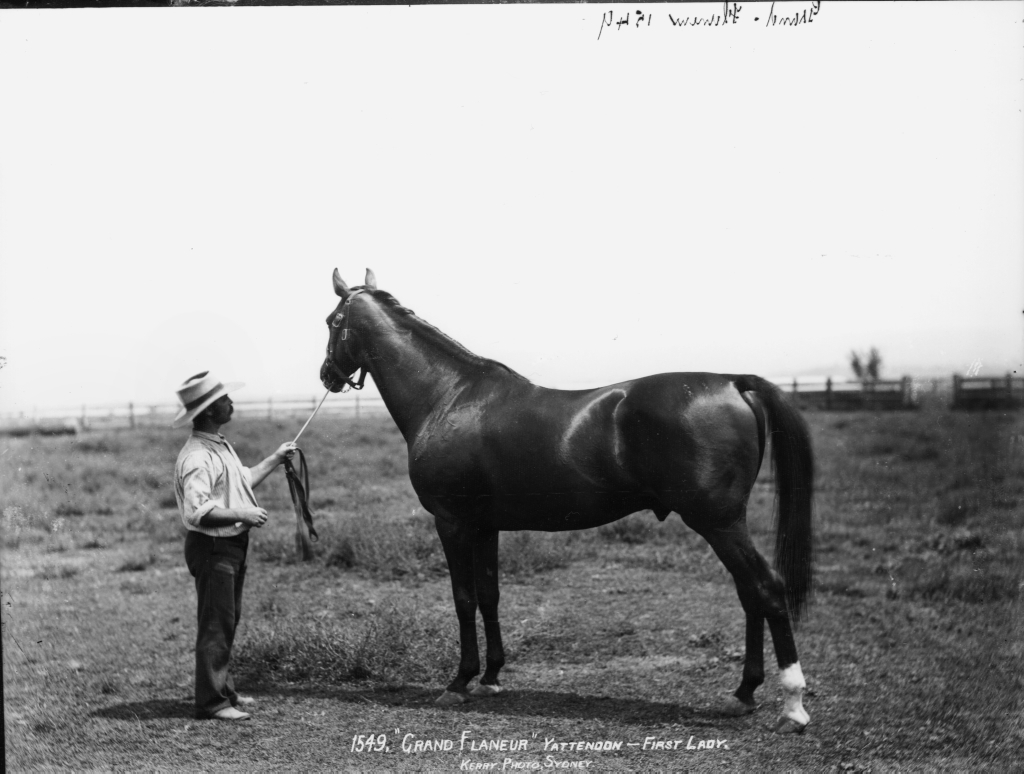
- Sire: Yattendon (AUS)
- Grandsire: Sir Hercules (AUS)
- Dam: First Lady (GB)
- Damsire: St. Albans (GB)
- Sex: Stallion
- Foaled: 1877
- Country: Australia
- Colour: Bay
- Breeder: Edward K. Cox MLC, Fernhill Stud
- Owner: William Alexander Long
- Trainer: Tom Brown
- Record: 9 starts, 9 wins
- Earnings: £8,105

Major wins
- AJC Derby (1880); Melbourne Cup (1880); AJC Mares Produce Stakes (1880); VRC Mares Produce Stakes (1880); Victoria Derby (1880); VRC St Leger Stakes (1881)

Awards
- 1895 Leading sire in Australia

Honours
- Australian Racing Hall of Fame (2007)
- Last updated on 20 July 2011

Grand Flaneur (1877–1900) was an outstanding Australian Thoroughbred racehorse and sire, who won nine successive races, including the AJC Derby, the Victoria Derby and the 1880 Melbourne Cup, before he retired undefeated. He had won races over distances ranging from five furlongs to three miles. He was the Leading sire in Australia in 1895 and was close to the top of the list for a decade.

== Pedigree ==
He was bred by Edward K. Cox at his Fernhill Stud near Mulgoa, New South Wales. Grand Flaneur was by the good racehorse and sire, Yattendon (sire of Chester, who was also bred by Cox), his dam was the imported First Lady (by St. Albans) who traced directly to the noted mare, Banter.

== Race record ==
=== Two-year-old ===
- Won 1880 VRC Normanby Stakes 5 furlongs (by a half length)

=== Three-year-old ===
- Won 1880 AJC Derby over 12 furlongs (by a half length)
- Won 1880 AJC Mares Produce Stakes 10 furlongs (by 1½ lengths)
- Won 1880 VRC Mares Produce Stakes 10 furlongs (by 1½ lengths)
- Won 1880 Melbourne Cup 16 furlongs (by 1 length)
- Won 1880 VRC Victoria Derby 12 furlongs (by 1 length)
- Won 1881 VRC Champion Stakes 24 furlongs (by 1 length)
- Won 1881 VRC St Leger Stakes 14 furlongs (by 1½ lengths)
- Won 1881 VRC Town Plate 16 furlongs (by 1 length)

== Stud record ==
After an injury Grand Flaneur was retired to Andrew Town’s Hobartville Stud at Richmond, New South Wales. Grand Flaneur sired the Melbourne Cup winner, Bravo, in his first crop. He was the leading Australian sire in 1894–95 and was then standing at Long’s Chipping Norton Stud. Grand Flaneur sired 23 stakes winners for 45 stakes wins and more than £50,000, including, Hopscotch (AJC Epsom Handicap etc.), Merman (GB Ascot Gold Cup and GB Goodwood Cup), Parthian (AJC St Leger Stakes, VRC St Leger Stakes etc.) and Patron (Melbourne Cup).

Grand Flaneur died in 1900 at the Chipping Norton Stud, near Liverpool, New South Wales where he is buried. Grand Flaneur Beach in Chipping Norton is named after him.

In 2007 Grand Flaneur was inducted into the Australian Racing Hall of Fame.

== Pedigree ==
Pedigree of Grand Flaneur, bay stallion, 1877
| Sire Yattendon 1861 | Sir Hercules (AUS); 1843 | Cap-a-Pie | The Colonel |
| Sire Yattendon 1861 | Sir Hercules (AUS); 1843 | Cap-a-Pie | Sultan mare |
| Sire Yattendon 1861 | Sir Hercules (AUS); 1843 | Paraguay | Sir Hercules (IRE) |
| Sire Yattendon 1861 | Sir Hercules (AUS); 1843 | Paraguay | Paradigm |
| Sire Yattendon 1861 | Cassandra; 1841 | Tros | Priam |
| Sire Yattendon 1861 | Cassandra; 1841 | Tros | Ally |
| Sire Yattendon 1861 | Cassandra; 1841 | Alice Grey | Rous Emigrant |
| Sire Yattendon 1861 | Cassandra; 1841 | Alice Grey | Gulnare |
| Dam First Lady 1865 | St Albans; 1857 | Stockwell | The Baron |
| Dam First Lady 1865 | St Albans; 1857 | Stockwell | Pocahontas |
| Dam First Lady 1865 | St Albans; 1857 | Bribery | The Libel |
| Dam First Lady 1865 | St Albans; 1857 | Bribery | Splitvote |
| Dam First Lady 1865 | Lady Patroness; 1860 | Orlando | Touchstone |
| Dam First Lady 1865 | Lady Patroness; 1860 | Orlando | Vulture |
| Dam First Lady 1865 | Lady Patroness; 1860 | Lady Palmerston | Melbourne |
| Dam First Lady 1865 | Lady Patroness; 1860 | Lady Palmerston | Pantaloon mare |

== See also ==
- List of leading Thoroughbred racehorses
