= St Thomas' Anglican Church, Mulgoa =

St Thomas' Anglican Church
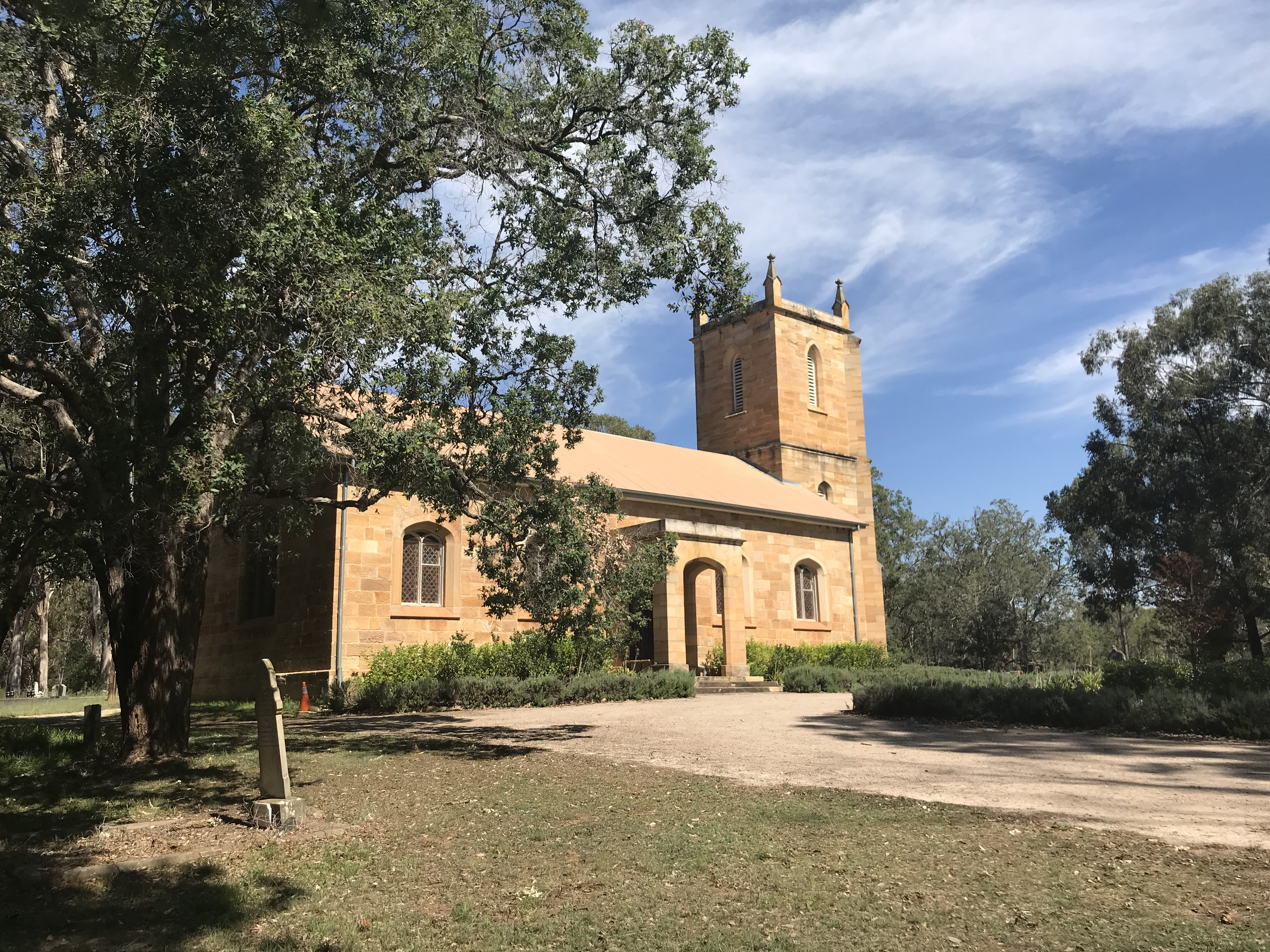
- St Thomas' Anglican Church, Mulgoa

- Location in greater metropolitan Sydney
- 33°49′47″S 150°39′20″E
- Location: St Thomas Road, Mulgoa, New South Wales
- Country: Australia
- Denomination: Anglicanism
- Website: sydneyanglicans.net/findachurch/st_thomas_mulgoa

History
- Status: Parish church
- Founded: 22 August 1836
- Founder: Rev Thomas Makinson

Architecture
- Functional status: Active
- Architect: James Chadley
- Architectural type: Church
- Style: Victorian Gothic Revival
- Completed: 13 September 1838

Specifications
- Materials: Sydney sandstone

Administration
- Diocese: Sydney

New South Wales Heritage Register
- Official name: St. Thomas Anglican Church; St Thomas Church of England
- Type: State heritage (Complex / Group)
- Designated: 2 April 1999
- Reference no.: 426
- Type: Church
- Category: Religion
- Builders: James Atkinson and William Chisholm (Atkinson also carved the pinnacled reredos himself)

St Thomas' Anglican Church is a heritage-listed Anglican church located in the western Sydney suburb of Mulgoa in the City of Penrith local government area of New South Wales, Australia. The church forms part of the Diocese of Sydney. It was designed by Reverend Thomas Makinson, first incumbent priest and James Chadley and built from 1836 to 1838 by James Atkinson and William Chisholm (Atkinson also carved the pinnacled reredos himself). It is also known as St. Thomas Anglican Church and St Thomas Church of England. The property is owned by Anglican Church Property Trust. It was added to the New South Wales State Heritage Register on 2 April 1999.

St Thomas' Church is located on land granted to the Anglican Church in 1831 by pioneer, William Cox. The church contains a mechanical organ that was built in 1868 by J. W. Walker of London, with a manual compass of 56 notes, a hitch-down Swell pedal, with 159 pipes.

== History ==
Between 1809-c. 1904 early land grants were made in the valley to the notable Cox family and were noted for pastoral use, vineyards and orcharding. The Mulgoa Valley was renowned at one time as one of NSW's richest farming districts. The Cox family were influential in the district and state. They suffered the financial depression of the 1840s but eventually their pastoral interests took them further afield, relocating west of the Blue Mountains. They left behind four buildings - Glenmore, Fernhill, The Cottage and St. Thomas's Church - reflecting the early pioneering phase, their era of prosperity and their social and religious aspirations.

The site was originally granted to the Anglican Church in 1831 by William Cox to be used as a church and school.

St. Thomas' church was built by James Atkinson & William Chisholm in 1836-8 and designed by the Rev. Thomas Makinson, first incumbent, and James Chadley. Makinson carved the pinnacled reredos himself. The site has a picturesque graveyard of clustered headstones and notable classical sandstone monuments, predominantly of the pastoralist Cox family, on a sloping site bordered with regenerating eucalypts, which complements the church.

1987 Sydney REP 13 (Mulgoa Valley) was gazette, reflecting increasing conservation interest in this important early farming valley, valued for its scenic value, ongoing agriculture, "lifestyle" living and heritage values. St. Thomas' Church and cemetery is a key part of this valley and an identified heritage item in the SREP.

The Anglican parish at Mulgoa still meet in St. Thomas' Church.

== Description ==
This is a hillside site north of Mulgoa township in a semi-rural area sloping south and east, facing St. Thomas's Road, bordered with regrowth eucalypt seedlings. On the opposite side of St. Thomas' Road is the Mulgoa Pre-School and Day Care centre and Mulgoa Park (comprising oval, hall and tennis courts) between St. Thomas' & Littlefield Roads. To the south-east are Kings Hill Road & Farm Road which have a number of small rural land holdings characterizing development in the township's surrounds.

The church and hall which are on the northern part of the site have a picturesque graveyard of clustered headstones and notable classical sandstone monuments, predominantly of the pastoralist Cox family (who donated the land and owned (along with other lands such as Winbourne to the south) the two immediately adjacent estates, Fernhill & The Cottage/Cox's Cottage. An existing driveway to the church is at the north-eastern end of the site. The balance of the site includes open grass paddocks, 2 small dams, fences, areas of disturbed, regenerating native vegetation and areas of bushland predominantly along the eastern part of the site and fringing Mulgoa and St. Thomas' Roads, providing a vegetated screen to the majority of the site. South of the church and almost centrally to the land are the ruins of the former rectory, burnt in the 2003 bush fires.

The site is a sloping hillside site, bordered with regrowth eucalypt seedlings. The church has a picturesque graveyard of clustered headstones and notable classical sandstone monuments, predominantly of the pastoralist Cox family.

The church is a sandstone Gothic revival style building, with Georgian proportions but early Victorian Gothic Revival details and the first open timber hammer beam roof in the colony. The east end has a stained glass window by the early Victorian era artist Charles Clutterbuck who also provided the east window of the Garrison Church, Miller's Point. The subject is stories of the Apostle Thomas.

=== Condition ===
As at 12 May 2004, the only reasonably intact late 1830s Gothic Revival rural Anglican parish church in NSW. Superb landscape setting and aesthetic value as an ensemble.

St. Thomas' Road, c. 1830s, is an original country road with branches leading to many properties and buildings from earliest times;

- site of colonial parsonage and drive, c. 1838 - earth ledge and old bricks, remnant garden planting located immediately behind back fence of new rectory of St. Thomas' Church. Distinct impression of road with remains of gate posts and side fences and possibly picket gate (S.6.5.4, Mulgoa, of appendix D, Historical Archaeological Component by Wendy Thorp, 8/1986 in Fox & Associates, Heritage Study of the City of Penrith, Volume 2 - appendices).

There are three areas of archaeological interest. The church site is of early colonial interest with the ancestry of the Cox family displayed in the churchyard. It is also of Aboriginal archaeological interest as a camping area overlooking the junction of the 2 streams (see Austral Archaeology report). On the southern portion of the site the archaeological remains of the original rectory are buried and will also require protection. The location of the original rectory building has been established on the ridge south of the church (refer to A121/1 and the 1947 aerial photo where it was still standing). The design of the development will protect this area while allowing for future archaeological investigation of the site as a possible educational tool.

As defined in the archaeological report, the area of major archaeological importance is located within the church site in which minimal disturbance is taking place. The area south of the church where the school is proposed is defined as of lesser historic and archaeological significance. However the recommendations of the report will be followed during excavation and investigation of the site.

=== Modifications and dates ===
The parsonage (c. 1836-8) was demolished c. 1964; and the current parsonage is c. 1968.

== Heritage listing ==
As at 12 May 2004, St. Thomas' is the only extant example of a reasonably intact, late 1830s Gothic Revival, rural Anglican parish church in New South Wales. Its cemetery contains some important early monuments, dating from 1839 and the graves of members of prominent local families.

The golden stone church, with attendant cemetery and gravestones, has a considerable aesthetic impact when glimpsed from Mulgoa Road (now St. Thomas' Road). The picturesque graveyard of clustered headstones and notable classical sandstone monuments, predominantly of the Cox family, is on a sloping site alongside, bordered with eucalpyt saplings, and complements the church admirably. It remains one of the most romantic rural church settings in New South Wales, and has significance both for its superb landscape value and its relative intactness.

The hammer beam roof was the first example of a medieval style open timber roof in a NSW Church and the building as a whole is only existing example of a reasonably intact late 1830s Gothic Revival rural Anglican parish Church in the State. Most of the Church has not been drastically altered, a fact which makes it unique among Anglican Churches.

St Thomas' Anglican Church, Mulgoa was listed on the New South Wales State Heritage Register on 2 April 1999.

== See also ==
- Australian non-residential architectural styles
- List of Anglican churches in the Diocese of Sydney
