= Patron (horse) =

Australian thoroughbred racehorse

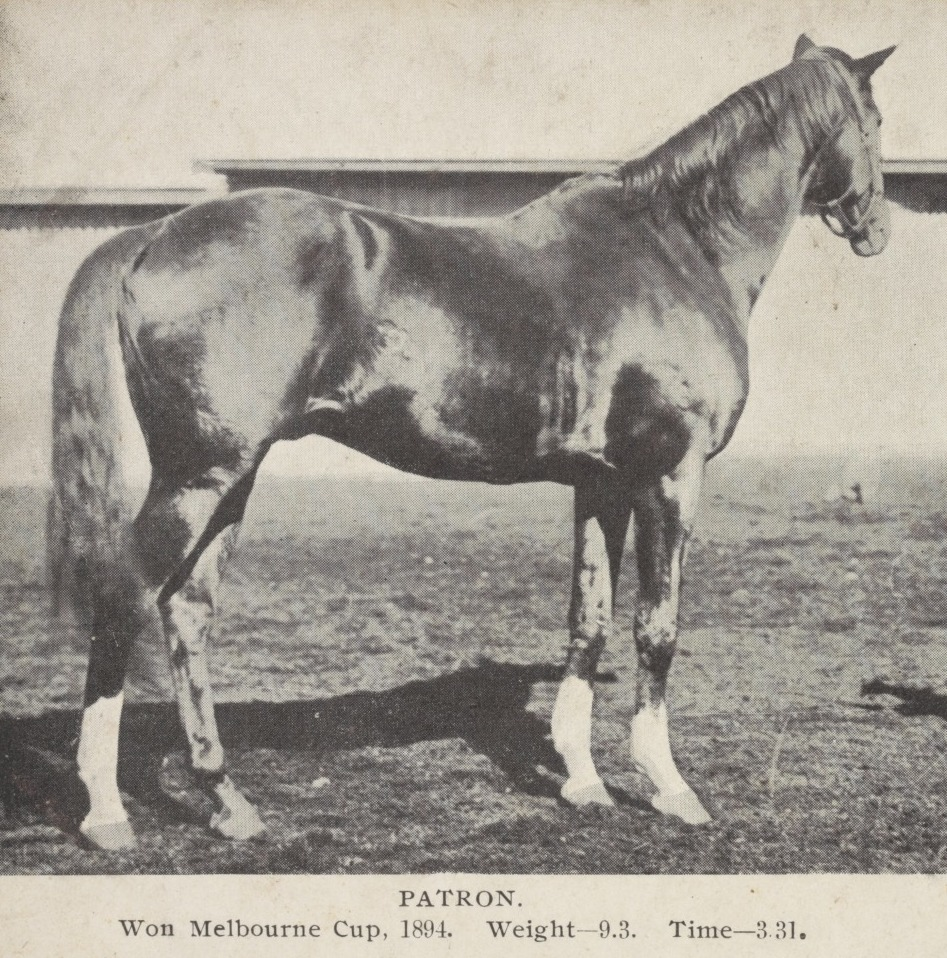
- Patron, 1894 Melbourne Cup winner
- Sire: Grand Flaneur
- Grandsire: Yattendon
- Dam: Olga
- Damsire: Piscator
- Sex: Stallion
- Foaled: 1890
- Country: Australia
- Colour: Chestnut
- Owner: F W Purches
- Trainer: Richard Bradfield
- Record: 43: 9-11-5

Major wins
- VRC Sires' Produce (1893); Caulfield Guineas (1893); Canterbury Plate (1893); VRC St Leger (1894); Craven Plate (1894); Melbourne Cup (1894)

Patron (foaled 1890) was an Australian bred thoroughbred racehorse that is most notable for winning the 1894 Melbourne Cup.

== 1894 Melbourne Cup ==
Patron started at odds of 33/1 in the 1894 Melbourne Cup, with his full brother, Ruenalf, also in the race as the 3/1 favourite. Patron would win the race by three-quarters of a length with his older brother finishing unplaced.

There was no trophy awarded to the winner of the race in 1894 as the country was suffering an economic depression.

== Later life ==
In 1897 Patron was sold to an English client of the International Horse Agency in London.

== Pedigree ==
Pedigree of Patron (AUS) 1890
Sire Grand Flaneur (AUS) 1877	Yattendon (AUS); 1861	Sir Hercules	Cap-a-Pie
Sire Grand Flaneur (AUS) 1877	Yattendon (AUS); 1861	Sir Hercules	Paraguay
Sire Grand Flaneur (AUS) 1877	Yattendon (AUS); 1861	Cassandra	Tros
Sire Grand Flaneur (AUS) 1877	Yattendon (AUS); 1861	Cassandra	Alice Grey
Sire Grand Flaneur (AUS) 1877	First Lady (GB); 1865	St Albans	Stockwell*
Sire Grand Flaneur (AUS) 1877	First Lady (GB); 1865	St Albans	Bribery
Sire Grand Flaneur (AUS) 1877	First Lady (GB); 1865	Lady Patroness	Orlando
Sire Grand Flaneur (AUS) 1877	First Lady (GB); 1865	Lady Patroness	Lady Palmerston
Dam Olga (AUS) 1880	Piscator (AUS); 1872	The Marquis	Stockwell*
Dam Olga (AUS) 1880	Piscator (AUS); 1872	The Marquis	Cinzinelli
Dam Olga (AUS) 1880	Piscator (AUS); 1872	Rose de Florence	The Flying Dutchman
Dam Olga (AUS) 1880	Piscator (AUS); 1872	Rose de Florence	Boarding School Miss
Dam Olga (AUS) 1880	Beatrice (AUS); 1866	Stockowner	Stockwell*
Dam Olga (AUS) 1880	Beatrice (AUS); 1866	Stockowner	Ennui
Dam Olga (AUS) 1880	Beatrice (AUS); 1866	Lady Heron	Fisherman
Dam Olga (AUS) 1880	Beatrice (AUS); 1866	Lady Heron	Omen

* Patron is inbred 4S x 4D x 4D to the stallion Stockwell, meaning that he appears fourth generation once on the sire side of his pedigree, and fourth generation twice on the dam side of his pedigree.
