= The Colonel (horse) =

British-bred Thoroughbred racehorse

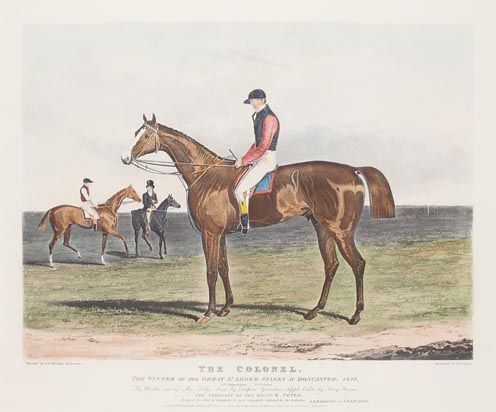
- The Colonel, by Richard Gilson Reeve (1803–1889)
- Sire: Whisker
- Grandsire: Waxy
- Dam: Delpini mare (My Lady's dam)
- Damsire: Delpini
- Sex: Stallion
- Foaled: 1825
- Country: United Kingdom
- Colour: Chestnut
- Breeder: Edward Petre
- Owner: Edward Petre; George IV; William IV
- Trainer: John Scott
- Record: 15:10-3-1

Major wins
- Champagne Stakes (1827); St Leger Stakes (1828); Epsom Craven Stakes (1830, 1831); Great Park Stakes (1830); Northampton Gold Cup (1830)

The Colonel (1825–1847) was a British-bred Thoroughbred racehorse and sire best known for running a dead heat in The Derby and winning the St Leger Stakes in 1828. In a racing career which lasted from 1827 until 1831, The Colonel ran fifteen times and won ten races at distances ranging from six furlongs to three miles. Apart from the St Leger, his most notable successes came in the Champagne Stakes, the Epsom Craven Stakes (twice), the Great Park Stakes at Ascot and the Northampton Gold Cup. He was also placed in both the Ascot Gold Cup and Goodwood Cup.

Originally trained in Yorkshire by John Scott, The Colonel later moved to the royal stable and won races for two British monarchs. Following his retirement from racing he stood as a breeding stallion in Britain and Germany with moderate results, although some of his descendants achieved success in Australia.

== Background ==
The Colonel was a "compact" chestnut horse with a broad white blaze standing 15.2 hands high. He was owned and bred by Edward Petre (1794–1848), a free-spending sportsman and gambler, who was a younger son of Robert Petre, 9th Baron Petre. The Colonel was sired by the Duke of Grafton's horse Whisker who won the 1815 Epsom Derby before becoming a successful breeding stallion. His dam, an unnamed daughter of Delpini also produced My Lady, an influential broodmare whose modern descendants include Midway Lady and Eswarah. Like the rest of Edward Petre's horses, The Colonel was trained by John Scott, who sent out the winners of 41 classics, from his Whitewall Stables at Malton in North Yorkshire. The colt was ridden in most of his early races by his trainer's younger brother Bill Scott.

== Racing career ==
=== 1827: two-year-old season ===
The Colonel began his racing career in a sweepstakes for two-year-olds at Leeds Racecourse on 27 June. Ridden by Bill Scott, he started favourite in a field of seven runners and "won easy" from Lord Fitzwilliam's filly Kitty. On 6 September he won a similar event at Pontefract Racecourse, beating Thomas Houldsworth's colt Vanish and two others by ten lengths "in a canter". Eleven days later, The Colonel was sent to the St Leger meeting at Doncaster where he won the fifth running of the Champagne Stakes in "very easy" style. He started the 1/3 favourite for the race which carried the condition that the winning owner had to give six dozen bottles of champagne to the Doncaster racing club.

=== 1828: three-year-old season ===
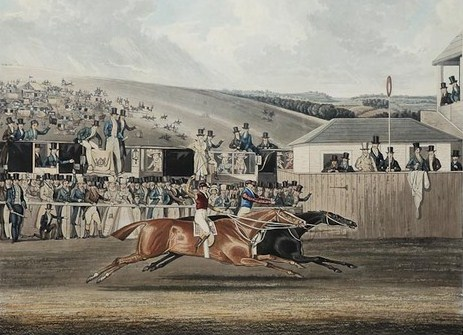
The Colonel is beaten by Cadland in the deciding heat of the 1828 Derby as depicted in an aquatint by James Pollard.

The Colonel made his first appearance of the season in the Derby at Epsom Downs Racecourse on 15 May. At this time, the practical difficulties involved in transporting racehorses meant that few horses from the North of England competed in the major southern courses. The Colonel's performance and reputation however, had seen him strongly supported in the betting markets since the since his win in the Champagne Stakes, and on the day he was made 7/2 favourite in a field of fifteen runners. His main rival in the betting was the Duke of Rutland's colt Cadland, the winner of the 2000 Guineas, who was ridden by Jem Robinson. Bill Scott tracked the front-running Cadland throughout the race before challenging for the lead in the straight. He briefly headed the Guineas winner a furlong from the finish, but Cadland fought back and the two horses crossed the line together. The judge declared a dead heat, much to the displeasure of The Colonel's supporters, who felt that their horse had finished the race fractionally in front. The deciding heat took place at the end of the afternoon, with The Colonel slightly favoured in the betting. Scott repeated his earlier tactics by holding The Colonel back for a late challenge, but was unable to overtake his rival and the Yorkshire colt was beaten by a neck.

The Colonel returned to Yorkshire and did not run again before challenging for the St Leger at Doncaster in September. John Scott had another contender for the race in the talented but injury-prone colt Velocipede who had not been entered for the Derby. In a trial gallop shortly before the race, Velocipede decisively defeated The Colonel but sustained a leg injury in the process and appeared at Doncaster with his legs heavily bandaged. Another leading fancy for the race was the filly Bessy Bedlam, the only horse to have beaten Velocipede. In a field of nineteen runners, The Colonel, ridden as usual by Bill Scott, started the 3/1 favourite ahead of Velocipede on 7/2. After the chaotic start to the 1827 St Leger the jockeys were warned by the racecourse officials that no misconduct would be tolerated and the race began in a fair and orderly manner. Scott positioned The Colonel in third or fourth place as Velocipede made the running from Bessy Bedlam. The filly was beaten before the straight, and when Velocipede weakened a furlong from the finish The Colonel took the lead pursued by the 35/1 outsider Belinda. In the closing stages The Colonel went clear and won easily by three lengths from Belinda, with Velocipede in third. Despite the apparently decisive nature of the victory, the Sporting Magazine considered the race to be an unsatisfactory one for at least two reasons: the Scotts were criticised for using Velocipede as a pacemaker rather than allowing him to compete on his own merits, and there were strong rumours that Bessy Bedlam had been prevented from showing her best form by some kind of "foul play". Two days after his win in the St Leger, The Colonel was able to claim an uncontroversial victory when he was allowed to walk over in a sweepstakes over the same course and distance.

At the end of the 1828 season, The Colonel was bought for £4,000 by King George IV, who had decided to buy the horse after seeing a painting by John Frederick Herring. Following the King's dispute with the Jockey Club in 1791, his horses seldom competed at Newmarket Racecourse and often raced in the colours of Mr Delme Radcliffe.

=== 1829: four-year-old season ===
The Colonel's third season was scheduled to begin with a match race against Bessy Bedlam at York Racecourse on 25 May. As The Colonel had already been moved to a stable in the south, he failed to appear for the race, allowing his opponent to claim a prize of 300 sovereigns. His only actual race of the season came the following month when he ran in the Ascot Gold Cup over two and a half miles. The race attracted an exceptionally strong field, including Cadland, Zinganee, Mameluke and The Oaks winner Green Mantle. The Colonel started the 7/2 second favourite but finished unplaced behind Zinganee.

One explanation for The Colonel's poor performance at Ascot was provided by a correspondent of the Sporting Magazine. According to this anecdote The Colonel was removed from his stable on the Sunday before the race by "a drunken fellow", and ridden to an inn several miles away. The man arrived at four o'clock in the morning and repeatedly demanded to be served with a "pot of ale", only relenting and turning back to Ascot when The Colonel was recognised by one of the other guests.

=== 1830: five-year-old season ===
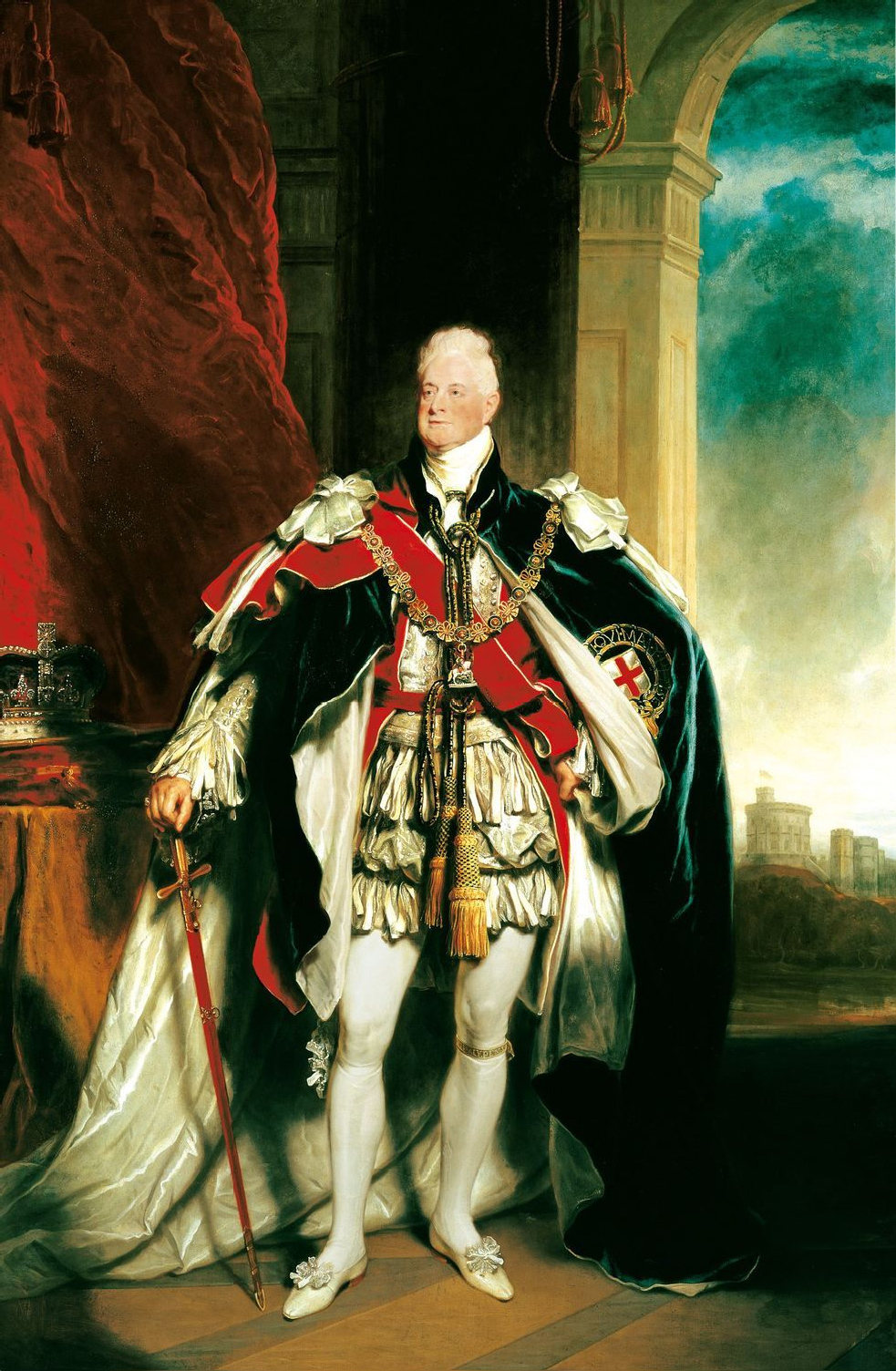
King William IV, who inherited The Colonel in 1830.

Before the start of the 1830 season, The Colonel underwent an "actual cautery" on his legs, an operation performed by the King's veterinary surgeon William Goodwin. On 25 May, The Colonel returned to Epsom for the first time since his run in the Derby. He started the 2/1 favourite against nine opponents for the Craven Stakes, an all-aged race over one and a quarter miles. Ridden by George Nelson, he took the lead after half a mile and won by two lengths without being seriously challenged from Mr Rogers' four-year-old Harold. In June he ran in his second Ascot Gold Cup and despite starting the 10/1 outsider of the field, he improved on his 1829 effort by finishing second to Sir Mark Wood's filly Lucetta, with Green Mantle third and Zinganee fourth. A week later, The Colonel appeared at Stockbridge Racecourse in Hampshire where he won a one and a half mile sweepstakes beating Ballad-Singer by a neck after "a beautiful race".

Following the death of George IV on 26 June, the ownership of his horses, as well as the crown, passed to his younger brother William IV, who raced them in his own name. The Colonel made his next appearance on 11 August when he contested the Gold Cup at Goodwood Racecourse. Ridden by Pavis, he finished third of the nine runners behind the King's other runners Fleur-de-Lis and Zinganee. There was some criticism of the way in which The Colonel was used as a pacemaker in this race: the Sporting Magazine claimed that the tactics had ruined his chance in a race he was capable of winning. Later that month he appeared at the year's second Ascot meeting to contest the Great Park Stakes. Despite running over a sprint distance of six furlongs he started the 1/4 favourite and won from Donegani, a three-year-old to whom he was conceding thirty-four pounds. The Colonel ended his season on 15 September when he was allowed to walk over the three mile course to win the Gold Cup at Northampton after the other fourteen entries had been withdrawn.

=== 1831: six-year-old season ===
The Colonel began his final season by running again in the Craven Stakes at Epsom. He started even money favourite and repeated his success on 1830 by beating Thomas Houldsworth's mare Fortitude and six others. The Colonel ended his racing career on 31 May in the Oatlands Stakes, a two and a half mile handicap race at Ascot. Carrying top weight of 132 pounds he ran a dead heat with Mouche a four-year-old filly who had finished second in the 1830 Oaks. He started favourite for the run-off, but was easily beaten by the filly, to whom he was conceding 29 pounds. The Colonel finished the deciding heat in considerable distress and pain as a result of aggravating an existing injury to the ligaments of his right hind leg. It took him half an hour to walk the half-mile to his stable, and he never ran again.

== Stud career ==
The Colonel began his career as a breeding stallion at the King's Hampton Court stud, where his services were offered for a fee of 12 sovereigns, with a sovereign to the groom. On the accession of Queen Victoria in 1837, her horses where put up for auction, and The Colonel topped the sale as he was bought for 1,550 guineas to Richard Tattersall. In the following year he was exported to Brunswick but returned to England five years later. The Colonel's most significant offspring was probably Cap-A-Pie, a colt who was exported to Australia where he became a highly successful stallion, with his descendants including the Melbourne Cup winners The Barb, Chester, Grand Flaneur, and Zulu. The Colonel died at Tattersall's Willeseden Paddocks stud in 1847.

== Sire line tree ==
- The Colonel
  - D'Egville
  - Cap-a-Pie
    - Sir Hercules
      - Yattendon
        - Dagworth
        - Chester
        - King Quail
        - Sweetmeat
        - Creswick
        - Grand Flaneur
        - Fitz Hercules
        - Calma
      - The Barb
        - Tocal
        - Strathearn
        - The Barber
      - Barbarian
        - Zulu
  - Chatham
    - Sittingborne
    - Student

== Pedigree ==
Pedigree of The Colonel (GB), chestnut stallion, 1825
Sire Whisker (GB) 1812	Waxy; 1790	Potoooooooo	Eclipse*
Sire Whisker (GB) 1812	Waxy; 1790	Potoooooooo	Sportsmistress
Sire Whisker (GB) 1812	Waxy; 1790	Maria	Herod*
Sire Whisker (GB) 1812	Waxy; 1790	Maria	Lisette
Sire Whisker (GB) 1812	Penelope; 1798	Trumpator	Conductor
Sire Whisker (GB) 1812	Penelope; 1798	Trumpator	Brunette
Sire Whisker (GB) 1812	Penelope; 1798	Prunella	Highflyer*
Sire Whisker (GB) 1812	Penelope; 1798	Prunella	Promise
Dam Delpini mare (GB) 1802	Delpini; 1781	Highflyer*	Herod*
Dam Delpini mare (GB) 1802	Delpini; 1781	Highflyer*	Rachel*
Dam Delpini mare (GB) 1802	Delpini; 1781	Countess	Blank*
Dam Delpini mare (GB) 1802	Delpini; 1781	Countess	Rib mare
Dam Delpini mare (GB) 1802	Tipple Cyder; 1788	King Fergus	Eclipse*
Dam Delpini mare (GB) 1802	Tipple Cyder; 1788	King Fergus	Creeping Polly
Dam Delpini mare (GB) 1802	Tipple Cyder; 1788	Sylvia	Young Marske
Dam Delpini mare (GB) 1802	Tipple Cyder; 1788	Sylvia	Ferre (Family:8-k)

* The Colonel is inbred 4S x 3D to the stallion Highflyer, meaning that he appears third generation on the sire side of his pedigree, and fourth generation on the dam side of his pedigree.

* The Colonel is inbred 4S x 5S x 4D to the stallion Herod, meaning that he appears fourth generation and fifth generation (via Highflyer) on the sire side of his pedigree, and fourth generation on the dam side of his pedigree.

* The Colonel is inbred 4S x 4D to the stallion Eclipse, meaning that he appears fourth generation on the sire side of his pedigree, and fourth generation on the dam side of his pedigree.

* The Colonel is inbred 5D x 4D to the stallion Blank, meaning that he appears fifth generation (via rachel) and fourth generation on the dam side of his pedigree.
