= Chester (horse) =

Australian-bred Thoroughbred racehorse

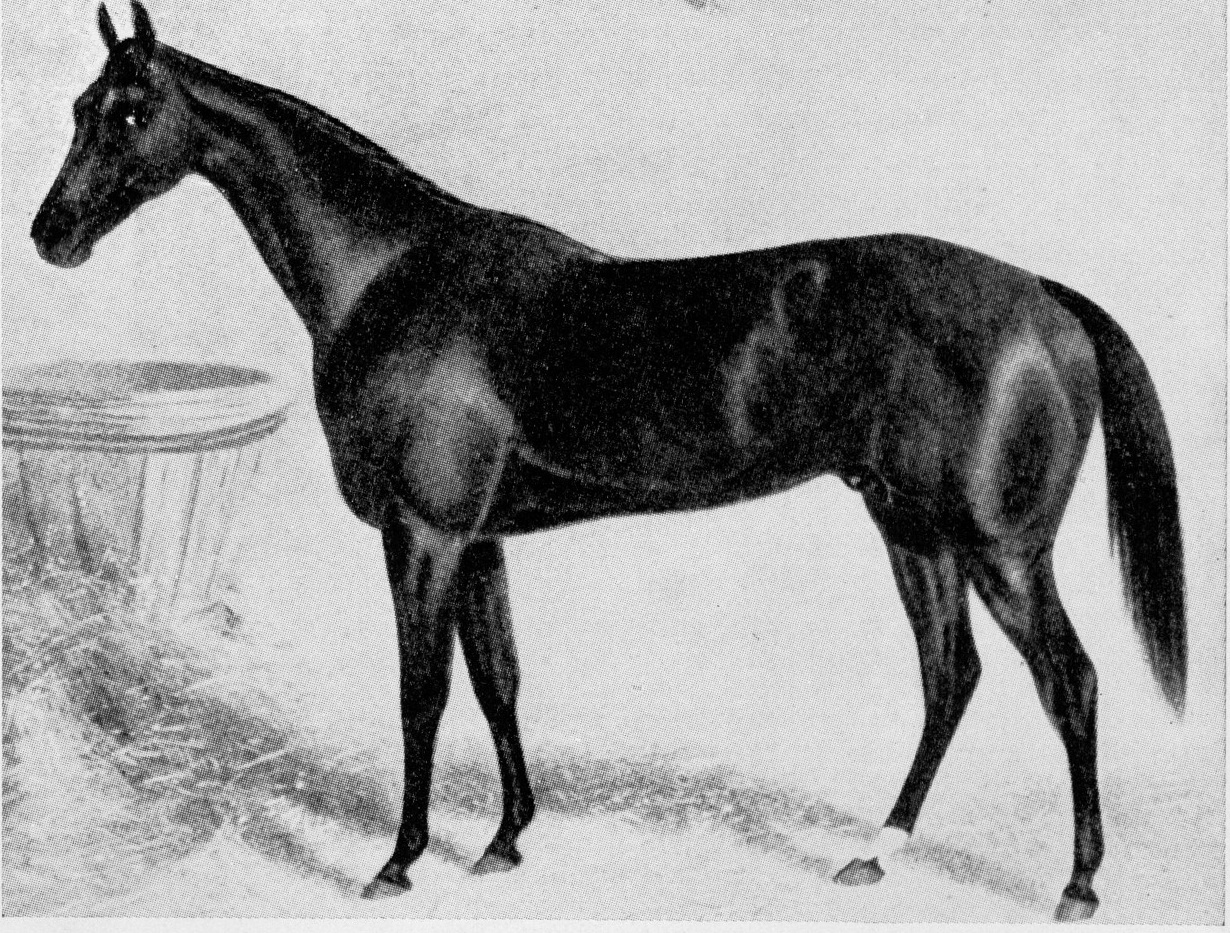
- Chester c.1878
- Sire: Yattendon
- Grandsire: Sir Hercules
- Dam: Lady Chester (GB)
- Damsire: Stockwell
- Sex: Stallion
- Foaled: 1874
- Died: 1891
- Country: Australia
- Colour: Brown
- Breeder: Hon. Edward King Cox
- Owner: Hon. James White
- Trainer: Etienne de Mestre
- Record: 29: 19-6-1
- Earnings: $53,000

Major wins
- Champagne Stakes (1877); AJC Sires' Produce Stakes (1877); Victoria Derby (1877); Melbourne Cup (1877); AJC Spring Stakes (1878, 1879); Melbourne Stakes (1878, 1880); Craven Plate (1878); AJC Plate (1878, 1879)

Awards
- Leading sire in Australia (1888, 1890, 1892, 1893)
- Last updated on 18 May 2009

Chester (1874–1891) was an Australian thoroughbred racehorse and a leading sire. He defeated some of the best horses in training over distances ranging from five furlongs (one thousand metres) to three miles (four thousand eight hundred metres). He was the leading sire in Australia on four occasions.

== Breeding ==
Chester, on the side of his sire, was a third generation colonial-bred Australian stallion. Chester's sire was the influential stallion Yattendon, who was serving mares while still racing. His dam Lady Chester (GB) was by Stockwell from Austrey by Harkaway. Stockwell was out of the breed-shaping broodmare, Pocahontas.

== Racing career ==
Chester's illustrious racing career began on New Year's Day 1877 in the Sydney Tattersall's Two Year Old Stakes, in which he came a close second to Viscount. After that, Chester won three consecutive races, all in the same week, and was spelled to await his three-year-old season. He was ridden in these three wins by jockey, G.Donnelly. Chester was then sold to James White.

As a flying three-year-old, Chester won seven of his ten starts, setting three race records. He placed short-head second in the AJC Derby. Two starts after the AJC Derby, he started in the VRC Derby, he won, and claimed a track record – 2:43 – a record that held itself until 1897 by Amberite. His next race, just three days after his Derby triumph, was the gruelling two-mile (3,200m) Melbourne Cup over a slippery, muddy track. Chester held on to beat the lightly weighted Savanaka by a half-head in the record time of 3:33½.

He took a long and deserving spell after his spring campaign, and didn't return to racing until the April 1878. During his return, he won the AJC Autumn Stakes and two days later took second to Savanaka in the two-mile Sydney Cup, giving Savanaka twelve pounds. He won the AJC Cumberland Stakes over two miles, the next day winning the three-mile AJC Plate.

Lame for the majority of his next season, Chester ran twice. He won the AJC Spring Stakes over 12 furlongs, and came third in the AJC Craven Plate. A year later, he ventured out for the VRC Melbourne Stakes, which he won, despite being lame. He was entered in the Melbourne Cup two days later, assigned with top weight of 9 st 6 lb (60 kg), but sore and out of condition for the two-miler, he placed sixth, with yet another Yattendon son, Grand Flaneur, taking the money.

== Stud record ==
By the time Chester had retired to stand at Kirkham Stud, near Camden, his owner, James White, had purchased a number of well-bred colonial broodmares. He began to build up a high-quality broodmare band through the 1880s, including Chester's dam, Lady Chester. White had also purchased Martini-Henry, by Musket, as a stallion for Kirkham, and he used as a cross with Chester daughters with some success. His best son, Abercorn (AJC Derby), defeated Carbine several times. Chester sired 26 stakeswinners for 104 stakeswins, including Camoola (AJC & VRC Derbies), Carlyon, Dreadnought, Stromboli (AJC Derby, Sydney Cup), Titan and Uralla.

Chester led the sire's list in Australia in 1887–88, 1889–90, 1891–92 and 1892–93, the latter two posthumous placings since Chester died on the 21 November 1891, aged seventeen from rupturing his bowel. He was buried at Kirkham Stud.

== Sire line tree ==
- Chester
  - First Chester
  - Monte Cristo
  - Phillip Augustus
  - Plutarch
  - Volcano
  - Abercorn
    - Cobbity
    - Coil
      - Sea Bound
    - Cocos
  - Carlyon
    - Gunga Din
    - Rienzy
  - Cranbrook
  - Dreadnought
    - Dauntless
    - Renown
  - Kirkham
    - Kirkland
    - Kirko
  - Narellan
  - Titan
  - Victor Hugo
  - Stromboli
  - Autonomy
  - Camoola
  - Warpaint
    - Black Paint
  - Projectile
  - Chesterman
  - Duke Of York
  - Prince Chester

== Pedigree ==
Pedigree of Chester, brown stallion, 1874
Sire Yattendon 1861	Sir Hercules (AUS); 1843	Cap-a-Pie	The Colonel
Sire Yattendon 1861	Sir Hercules (AUS); 1843	Cap-a-Pie	Sultan mare
Sire Yattendon 1861	Sir Hercules (AUS); 1843	Paraguay	Sir Hercules (IRE)*
Sire Yattendon 1861	Sir Hercules (AUS); 1843	Paraguay	Paradigm
Sire Yattendon 1861	Cassandra; 1841	Tros	Priam*
Sire Yattendon 1861	Cassandra; 1841	Tros	Ally
Sire Yattendon 1861	Cassandra; 1841	Alice Grey	Rous Emigrant
Sire Yattendon 1861	Cassandra; 1841	Alice Grey	Gulnare
Dam Lady Chester 1870	Stockwell; 1849	The Baron	Birdcatcher*
Dam Lady Chester 1870	Stockwell; 1849	The Baron	Echidna*
Dam Lady Chester 1870	Stockwell; 1849	Pocahontas	Glencoe
Dam Lady Chester 1870	Stockwell; 1849	Pocahontas	Marpessa
Dam Lady Chester 1870	Austrey; 1851	Harkaway	Economist*
Dam Lady Chester 1870	Austrey; 1851	Harkaway	Fanny Dawson
Dam Lady Chester 1870	Austrey; 1851	Zeila	Emilius*
Dam Lady Chester 1870	Austrey; 1851	Zeila	Apollonia

* Chester is inbred 4S x 5D to the stallion Sir Hercules (IRE), meaning that he appears fourth generation on the sire side of his pedigree, and fifth generation (via Birdcatcher) on the dam side of his pedigree.

* Chester is inbred 5S x 4D to the stallion Emilius, meaning that he appears fifth generation (via Priam) on the sire side of his pedigree, and fourth generation on the dam side of his pedigree.

* Chester is inbred 5D x 4D to the stallion Economist, meaning that he appears and fifth generation (via Echidna) and fourth generation on the dam side of his pedigree.
