= Fairlight Homestead =

- Location within New South Wales Location within Australia
- 33°50′24″S 150°36′31″E
- Location: Fairlight Road, Mulgoa, City of Penrith, New South Wales, Australia

History
- Built: 1821–1890

New South Wales Heritage Register
- Official name: Fairlight Homestead & Barn
- Type: State heritage (landscape)
- Designated: 2 April 1999
- Reference no.: 262
- Type: Homestead Complex
- Category: Farming and Grazing

Fairlight Homestead is a heritage-listed homestead complex located at 377–429 Fairlight Road in the western Sydney suburb of Mulgoa, New South Wales, Australia. It was built from 1821 to 1890. It is also known as Fairlight Homestead & Barn. It was added to the New South Wales State Heritage Register on 2 April 1999.

== History ==
=== Norton family ===
James Norton was born in the mid-1700s descended from a landowning family that had resided for centuries in the County of Sussex, England. He emigrated to Australia in 1818 and practised as a solicitor. He was followed the next year by his father John, his brother Lieutenant Nathaniel and three of his sisters, all of whom arrived in Sydney aboard the Harriet on 8 February 1819. One of the sisters, Emma, was to marry John Oxley the Surveyor General of NSW and leader of several successful journeys of exploration. James was successful in his solicitor practice, which was active for over 40 years.

Three Government grants were made on 5 April 1821 - Northend of 384 hectares (950 acres) to James, Fairlight of 324 hectares (800 acres) to Nathaniel, and Grovers of 324 hectares (800 acres) to their father John in the Bringelly district. Norton's Basin on the Nepean River is named after John Norton. Later the family acquired a large estate in the Kanimbla Valley in the heart of the Blue Mountains, where they carried on agriculture and stock breeding for many years.

A house was built at Fairlight and the whole family moved in late 1821, while the three grants were managed as one from Fairlight by Nathaniel. The original homestead of Fairlight was built c. 1821. James continued to practise as a solicitor in the Leichhardt area and never took up residence on his own estate. The father, John, moved to a grant made later in the Kanimbla Valley. John Norton, with his younger son, James after a few years, moved down to the Kanimbla Valley to a large property on the Cox's River, leaving Nathaniel in possession of the Mulgoa grants, which henceforth became known under the name of Fairlight.

In 1821, the first house was built of slabs, plastered with clay, whitewashed, and originally had a shingled roof. It had two wings, each with two rooms. The doors were only 2 metres (6 ft) high, forcing a tall person to stoop when entering.

Nathaniel lived with one of his sisters until he married Ellen Barber in 1841. Rev James S Hassall, in his book "In Old Australia," wrote in about 1837 that Nathaniel Norton "...was an old naval man, a good hearted sailor, whom boys were fond of visiting." He died in 1851 aged 66 years, and Ellen died some 15 months later.

=== Helleyer family ===
William Arthur Helleyer, a Sydney solicitor, bought Fairlight after Nathaniel's death in 1863, and the property was eventually managed by his son. Mrs Helleyer wrote in 1869 "We have lovely fruit growing there, all kinds, also two vineyards and made wine. We were overrun with deer belonging to our neighbour, Mr E. King Cox, which was a great annoyance to us...".

The vineyard at Fairlight flourished with a large stone wine cellar, which recently was demolished by developers, being built opposite the house. A photograph of the original house, a windmill on the estate and a sample wine label from the Helleyer days are shown. Other photographs on p. 133 show the winery, noting its use of gravity - with its construction running down the slope; the barn and a domed pig feeder structure).

Snakes, bushfires and poor road access hurt the property's value and, eventually, Mr Helleyer sold it to Mr W. Jarret, who built up the estate. He built a new homestead, large stables, meat-curing rooms, fruit-drying lofts and a large building of four-storeys to store wine. Over-capitalised, he was forced to sell up.

=== William Jarret ===
William Jarret, a Sydney businessman in the second-half of the 19th century, took up the property. He saw its value as a wine-making place and spent 20,000 pounds improving it. In addition to the old homestead, there was an old stone wine cellar, a post windmill (only the post in the well now remains), and a wooden store for wine in casks, built against a cutting in the hillside. Jarret removed the wooden store and in replaced it was a four-storied solid brick building. Additionally, he built a dairy and creamery, with a men's quarters and kitchens, and a large room for an unknown purpose.

The present house and barn were built by Jarrett in the late 1860s and there are a number of trees that may have been part of his garden, such as the carob (Ceratonia siliqua), kurrajong (Brachychiton populneum) and turpentine (Syncarpia glomulifera).

Davies (2014, 142) says the current Fairlight house was built at the time of Jarrett's purchase in 1876.

c. 1890 the homestead was replaced by a substantial single storey brick dwelling, and the barn modified to provide a large workroom or dormitory on the upper level.

In 1914 the owner was Mr A.G.Witts.

=== Late 20th-21st century ===
The garden was last opened in 1993. A dry stone wall was built by a local stonemason, George Progmelja, and extends to the westerly aspect of the garden.

The garden was severely disturbed on 25 December 2001 when westerly winds fanned fires in the Blue Mountains, which leapt over the Nepean River and came to the area. Three houses were destroyed, and fruit orchards and packing sheds were damaged, but there were no fatalities. Fairlight was saved by the local fire brigade and the owner's sons. The garden on the western side near the pool was totally destroyed, as were areas of hedging. Following the fires, a severe wind storm came through in September 2003 caused further damage to the trees and flora.

== Description ==
The site is a very elevated one, with views across rolling landscapes to Sydney, the Nepean (River) gorge and to Camden and Mittagong. Two articles by Captain J. H. Watson in the Nepean Times of 24 and 31 October 1914 provide an account of the property:

'...Fairlight is one of the most lovely places in the county of Cumberland. Situated many hundred feet above the surrounding country, it commands extensive views in every direction but the west, but in that quarter is backed by the mountains. As in other parts of Mulgoa, evidences abound of early occupation...'

The original c. 1821 homestead was a single-storey building. At its rear a large barn was constructed. c. 1890 the homestead was replaced by a substantial single storeyed brick dwelling, and the barn modified to provide a large workroom or dormitory on the upper level.

The present house and barn were built by Jarrett in the late 1860s and there are a number of trees that may have been part of his garden, such as the carob (Ceratonia siliqua), kurrajong (Brachychiton populneum) and turpentine (Syncarpia glomulifera).

The present garden has been grafted on to these remnants. The line of Chinese elms (Ulmus parvifolia) forming the drive to the east of the house marks part of the original driveway. To the west, a rose walk (Rosa x "White Spray" and 'Iceberg') links the house with the tennis court and pool and incorporates an old Bougainvillea and quince (Cydonia oblonga) tree.

The majestic Port Jackson fig trees frame the south vista. Adjacent is the orchard and vegetable garden. Since the garden was last opened in 1993 the dry stone wall has been extended and now envelops the westerly aspect of the garden. The wall was built by a local stonemason, George Progmelja, whose craft had been handed down by his father, brought up in Serbia, where houses and dry stone walls are common in rural areas.

The owners have planted Bunya Bunya trees in the paddocks, a tree they neglected to plant in the past. Glimpses of the Blue Mountains and the Nepean Gorge can be seen through the rough barked apple gum (Angophora subvelutina / A.floribunda / A.intermedia).

This tranquil garden was severely disturbed on 25 December 2001 when strong, hot, westerly winds fanned fires in the Blue Mountains which leapt over the Nepean River and came swiftly to this area. Three houses were destroyed, fruit orchards and packing sheds felt the wrath but fortunately there were no fatalities. "Fairlight" was saved by the local fire brigade and the owner's sons. The garden on the western side near the pool was totally destroyed, as was the hedge on the fence line near the barn and other areas of hedging.

Following the fires, a severe wind storm came through in September 2003 and trees weakened by the fires came down as did huge limbs from the Port Jackson figs and Angophoras. The property is now facing a lack of rain - the last good rain was in February 2004. Currently dam levels are dropping so the owners are applying much mulch, being cautious with watering.

=== Condition ===
As at 28 November 2007, 1821 first house built. Of slabs, plastered with clay, whitewashed – originally shingle-roofed. It had two wings, each with two rooms. According to the style of the period the rooms were only 8' high, and the doors 6', meaning a tall man would have to stoop to enter. c. 1869 fruit of all kinds being grown, two vineyards on the property and wine making occurring. Large stone wine cellar (recently demolished). 1869-1872 Jarret builds a new homestead (adjoining the original homestead), large stables, meat-curing rooms, fruit drying lofts and a large four-storey building to store wine. c. 1912 post windmill demolished.

Of the post windmill, which was almost intact in 1976, only the post in the well now remains, and a wooden store for wine in casks, built up against a cutting in the side of a hill. This latter, in Jarret's time was removed, and in its place a four-storey solid-brick building (called "the barn" in 1981) was put up. Next to this, and also of brick, was a dairy and creamery, with men's quarters and kitchens, and a large room overhead 70' x 30' for what purpose it is difficult to say, iron bars with running hooks from side to side, indicate some kind of industry on an extensive scale was carried on, which none of the villagers have now any knowledge of. Machinery of various sorts, some still standing.

- underground tank, c.1821 – rendered sandstone possibly cellar of original house;
- remains of bath house, later 19th c. – remnants of brick baths and water works on foundations;
- remains of stone building, 19th c. – floor slabs of small dairy and sump and impressions of yards in grounds. Stone flagging;
- miscellaneous wells, early-late 19th c. – at least four;
- site of shed, c.1878 – one surviving wall;
- remains of stone building, pre 1850 – remnants of walls of stone cellar;
- site of former wine cellar and wooden store, pre 1876 – substantial masonry buildings only recently demolished; some footings still evident;
- site of colonial road – formerly (part of) Fairlight – part of road leading from Norton's Basin to Fairlight homestead. Partially destroyed by recent bulldozing;
- landing platform, cottage and 'Donahoe's Cave', c.1820s – stone landing platform and remnants of small cottage. Cave supposedly used by bushranger. (The above list taken from p. 93, of appendix D, Historical Archaeological Component by Wendy Thorp, 8/1986 in Fox & Associates, Heritage Study of the City of Penrith, Volume 2 – appendices)

=== Modifications and dates ===
1821: First house built. Of slabs, plastered with clay, whitewashed - originally shingle-roofed. It had 2 wings, each with 2 rooms. According to the style of the period, the rooms were only 8' high, and the doors 6', a tall man having to stoop to enter. c. 1869 Fruit of all kinds being grown, 2 vineyards on the property and wine making occurring. Large stone wine cellar (recently demolished). 1869-1872: Jarret builds a new homestead (adjoining the original homestead), large stables, meat-curing rooms, fruit drying lofts and a large 4-storey building to store wine. c. 1912 Post windmill demolished.

The post windmill, which was almost intact 5 years ago (1976), but only the post in the well now remains, and a wooden store for wine in casks, built up against a cutting in the side of a hill. This latter, in Jarret's time was removed, and in its place a 4 storied solid brick building (called "the barn" in 1981) was put up. Next to this, and also of brick, was a dairy and creamery, with men's quarters and kitchens, and a large room overhead 70' x 30' for what purpose it is difficult to say, iron bars with running hooks from side to side, indicate some kind of industry on an extensive scale was carried on, which none of the villagers have now any knowledge of. Machinery of various sorts, some still standing.

22/12/1969 a major 39 lot subdivision of Lot 30 DP237163 (inter alia) placing the house and barn on different lots. 1981 the owners bought the adjacent property to protect the historic barn of Fairlight from demolition. The barn was restored.

1990 photographs show a domed pig feeder structure, the winery and barn.

=== Further information ===
The Heritage Council undertook to review the area of land covered in the (PCO) order (PCO), currently about 10 acres, if 2 hectare subdivisions were permitted on surrounding land in future.

== Heritage listing ==
As at 11 October 2004, one of the few remaining substantial and well built Victorian houses within the Mulgoa Valley.

Fairlight is an historic property located on a very elevated site with views across rolling landscapes to Sydney, the Nepean River gorge and to Camden and Mittagong. In 1821 Macquarie gave grants of land to Nathaniel, James and John Norton. The original homestead was a single storeyed building not unlike Cox's Cottage, Mulgoa or Clarendon, Richmond. It was built in 1821 by Nathaniel Norton who occupied it until his death. At its rear a large 2 storey barn was constructed. The ground floor of the barn was used as a dairy and creamery, with men's quarters and kitchens. The upper floor appears to have been used for industry of some type. Both the barn and homestead exhibit open-roofed iron roof trusses of great architectural interest.

The property is also associated with later owners William Helleyer, Sydney solicitor, William Jarret, Sydney businessman for grape growing, wine making, fruit growing and drying and meat curing.

The original 1821 house stood beside the Port Jackson figs, remnants of the original garden including a row of cabbage palms and a clump of bamboo beside the driveway. The present house and barn were built by Jarret in the late 1860s and there are a number of trees that may have been part of his garden, such as the carob, kurrajong and turpentine. The line of Chinese elms forming the drive to the east of the house marks part of the original driveway.

Fairlight Homestead was listed on the New South Wales State Heritage Register on 2 April 1999.

== See also ==
- List of heritage houses in Sydney
- Bellevue, Glebe
