= 1894 Melbourne Cup =

Annual horse race in Victoria, Australia

- Melbourne Cup
- Location: Flemington Racecourse
- Date: 6 November 1894
- Distance: 2 miles
- Winning horse: Patron
- Winning time: 3:30.0
- Final odds: 33/1
- Jockey: Henry G Dawes
- Trainer: Richard Bradfield
- Owner: F. W. Purches
- Surface: Turf
- Attendance: 60,000

The 1894 Melbourne Cup was a two-mile handicap horse race which took place on Tuesday, 6 November 1894.

This year was the thirty-fourth running of the Melbourne Cup.

This is the list of placegetters for the 1894 Melbourne Cup.

Place	Name	Jockey	Trainer	Owner
1	Patron	Henry G Dawes	Richard Bradfield	F. W. Purches
2	Devon	G Robson	P T Heywood	
3	Nada	H J Morrison	H Munro	

== See also ==
- Melbourne Cup
- List of Melbourne Cup winners
- Victoria Racing Club
