= Glenmore, Mulgoa =

Glenmore
- Location within Sydney Location within Australia
- 33°47′53″S 150°39′14″E
- Location: 754-760 Mulgoa Road, Mulgoa, City of Penrith, New South Wales, Australia

History
- Built: 1809–1868

Site notes
- Website: www.glenmoregolf.com.au

New South Wales Heritage Register
- Official name: Glenmore; Glenmore Heritage Valley Golf and Country Club
- Type: State heritage (landscape)
- Designated: 2 April 1999
- Reference no.: 74
- Type: Historic Landscape
- Category: Landscape - Cultural

Glenmore is a heritage-listed former farm, vineyard, rural residence and private school and now golf club and function centre located at 754-760 Mulgoa Road in the outer western Sydney suburb of Mulgoa, New South Wales, Australia. It was built from 1809 to 1868. It is also known as Glenmore Heritage Valley Golf and Country Club. The property is privately owned. It was added to the New South Wales State Heritage Register on 2 April 1999.

== History ==
In 1809-16 the Luttrell family were granted land in the Mulgoa Valley, and sold this in 1815-16 to neighbour William Cox. Also in 1809 an adjoining 162 hectares (400 acres) of land were granted to William Cox - and used for pastoralism, had fine orchards and vineyards. Between 1816 and 1852 the Cox family had strong associations with Glenmore. The father William Cox retained Glenmore until 1817, conveying it then to his fourth son George. His brother Henry Cox bought the lands off George in 1823 at the time of his marriage, and is most closely associated with the property. In 1825 Henry gained another 344-hectare (850-acre) grant from William and George sold Henry a 259-hectare (640-acre) grant he had acquired in 1815 from Thomas Hobby.

In 1824-25 Glenmore homestead appears to have been built, on the former grant of Robert Luttrell. It was the principal home of Henry Cox and family and head station of his pastoral estates. By 1825 Henry had a large estate with fertile and well watered land between Mulgoa Creek and the Nepean River. Convicts were used to clear the holding. It was used as a holding farm for animals from his other lands west of the Blue Mountains, on their way to the markets in Sydney. Glenmore was a busy centre for many years, with grape vines, wheat, corn, alfalfa and all kinds of horse and cattle feed and sheep roaming the homestead.

In 1845-5 the first homestead was built for Henry Cox. In 1850 Heny Cox had his sheep transferred to a property he had purchased at Broombee between Mudgee and Bathurst. The family moved there in 1851. In 1852 Glenmore was sold to his half-brother, Alfred Cox, who in 1853 sold it to merchant Thomas Sutcliffe Mort. Between 1852 and c. 1920 was the Riley family association with Glenmore (the Rileys were already leasing land in the Mulgoa Valley).

In 1854 T. S. Mort sold Glenmore to James Riley (who was later to become the first Mayor of Penrith, in 1871). The estate was developed as his private home.

In the 1860s land use changed in the area from pastoralism to fruit growing and dairying, particularly with the arrival of the railway to Penrith in 1863 and thus ready access of products to the city markets. In c. 1868 the eastern wing of the house was added for James Riley. The farm was known (along with Winbourne, Fernhill and the Fairlight Homestead, for the abundance and success of their crops and vineyards. In 1882 James Riley died. His wife and four daughters remained living at Glenmore.

In 1891 the estate was put up for sale/rent, noting it was both residence and working farm. 810 hectares (2,000 acres) including 200 hectares (500 acres) of forest, fattening paddocks, homestead and "magnificent" grounds, three good dams and a spring at the cottage. In c. 1904 Riley's widow Christina died and his daughters set up a select girls' school in the house. In c. 1920s land acquisition of adjoining land, and land sales of portions by D. Hattersley & C. Holswich, graziers. Hattersley subsequently bought out Holswich. Portions of the estate were sold off during the 1920s - it was reduced to its present boundaries by 1929.

In 1926 the earliest plans to use it as a golf club arose, the course opened in 1927 (nine holes, now known as the course's 'back' holes), continuing in the 1930s with a guest house, tennis, horse riding, shooting, swimming, fishing, archery, table tennis and bridge. The valley was increasingly known for its scenery and historic associations. In the 1930s Glenmore operated as golf course and guest house under Mr & Mrs T. O'Rourke, also tennis, horse riding, shooting, swimming, fishing, archery, table tennis and bridge were available. The Mulgoa Valley was increasingly becoming known for its scenery and historic associations. (Winbourne was another key valley guesthouse of this era).

In 1937 the Glenmore Country Club purchased the property. In 1938 the Glenmore Country Club added an extra "front" nine holes to the course. In 1940 the southern part of the estate around the homestead was in use as golf links and the northern part was reserved as grasslands. In 1947 Glenmore and the golf links were bought by Mary Woodland, who leased it as a golf club to a succession of lessees. 1959 Glenmore Golf & Country Club bought the business, Mrs Woodland retained ownership of the land. A liquor licence was granted.

In 1975 the property was classified by the National Trust of Australia (NSW). In 1978 internal additions were made to main homestead including wall stripping, installation of a new bar, enlarging and reconcreting the patio, repainting, and reseeding/dressing the greens. From 1981+ there were at least two changes of owners.

Warren Anderson, a property developer from Western Australia, bought Glenmore in 1981, as well as nearby Fernhill, Boomerang in Elizabeth Bay and Tipperary pastoral stations in the Northern Territory.

From 1982 the Department of Planning conducted a Regional Environmental Study of the Mulgoa Valley, leading to SREP 13 - Mulgoa Valley gazetted in 1987, with an emphasis on the conservation of heritage, natural and landscape values. In 1986 a putting green was constructed.

In 1993 the present owners Askhour P/L bought the property, re-roofed and repainted the main house, recorded and demolished a side verandah to the main house, converted former barn to golf pro shop, constructed a fresh water pipeline from the Nepean River, installed a new electrical substation and underground mains, removed bunya pine tree #2, built new entry gates, driveway, parking areas, amenities building next to existing barn, machinery shed and compound. In 1993 the present owners re-roofed and repainted the house, converted the barn to a pro shop, constructed a pipeline from the Nepean, new substation and mains, built new entry gates, new driveway, parking areas, amenities building, machinery shed and compound.

In 1994 a proposed new function centre did not eventuate. A further proposal arose in 2004 but did not advance. In 1997 approval was given to convert the former barn into a golf pro-shop.

== Description ==
Glenmore lies between Mulgoa Road and Mulgoa Creek to the east and west, between two points to the north and south where road and creek are close together, south of Penrith. The land slopes gently upwards from Mulgoa Road to a ridgeline then falls steeply eastwards to the creek. The main homestead is near the site's centre, close to the ridgeline. Views to the house from the road are obstructed partly by landscaping and partly by the original stone barn, to its southwest.

A driveway from Mulgoa Road approaches the house and barn through a newly constructed parking area. Remnants of original tree plantings survive, particularly to the northwest of the homestead, together with some of the early hedge plants and trees beside the driveway to the south. The main homestead is U-shaped in plan with the front 2-storey wing facing northeast. The side wing facing northwest has a wine cellar under part of its length, and a disused attic towards its southwest end. A small lean-to on the northwest side was built in c.1920s. The opposite wing is single storey, with an extension at the southwest built c.1970s.

- 1809 – 162-hectare (400-acre) rural land grant with 1824+ homestead.
- 1868 – addition, large underground cellar for wine, stone barn, a school from c. 1904, and post 1920s subdivisions/sales a golf club from 1929 and more recently a function centre. Original layout included orchard and orangery areas, vegetable and split-rail fenced ornamental flower gardens, shrubbery, climbing plants covering a verandah, three dams, a spring near the cottage, double hawthorn hedge lining gravel entrance drive, teardrop bed in front of main house, rear service yard (abridged from Orwell & Peter Phillips, 2004)

Mature specimen trees include bunya-bunya pine (Araucaria bidwillii) and Chinese elm (Ulmus chinensis). (In the 1920s Glenmore was noted for its mature trees and English atmosphere, citing oaks (Quercus sp.) and elms (Ulmus sp.). Other mature trees include kurrajong (Brachychiton populneum) an exceptional example of Queensland kauri (Agathis robusta), Chinese elm (Ulmus parvifolia), pear (Pyrus pyrifolia), Osage orange (Maclura pomifera), weeping lilly pilly (Waterhousea floribunda) and conifers including hoop pine (Araucaria cunninghamii), stone pine (Pinus pinea) and funeral cypress (Cupressus funebris).

The surrounding pastures are ringed by native forest, being grey box (Eucalyptus moluccana)-ironbark (E.crebra) woodland, and also noted in this area for Angophora subvelutina, or rough-barked apple gums.

=== Condition ===
As at 28 November 2007:

- Ruin of kitchen courtyard?, c. 1825 ;
- Substantial remnants of garden walls with gateway; evidence of lean-to shed etc.;
- "house belonging to Gill" on Glenmore pre 1863 - building rubble and old planting;
- site of two houses of "Hoe" pre-1863 on Glenmore - exotic plantings, no visible (built) evidence.

=== Modifications and dates ===
- 1824/5 Glenmore appears to have been built,
- 1845-5 extensions (pre 1852) to an L-shaped building
- c. 1868 eastern wing added for James Riley
- c. 1904 select girls' school set up in house
- c. 1920s land acquisition of adjoining land, and land sales of portions by Hattersley & Holswich, graziers - reduced to present boundaries by 1929.
- 1927 golf course use began (9 holes)
- 1938 additional 9 holes added to course - 1930s operated as golf course and guest house
- 1978 internal additions made to main homestead including wall stripping, installation of a new bar, enlarging and reconcreting the patio, repainting, and reseeding/dressing the greens.
- 1986 putting green constructed in front of homestead (ranked intrusive in CMP, 1997)
- 1993 re-roofed and repainted the main house, recorded and demolished a side verandah to the main house, converted former barn to golf pro shop, constructed a fresh water pipeline from the Nepean River, installed a new electrical substation and underground mains, removed bunya pine tree #2, built new entry gates, driveway, parking areas, amenities building next to existing barn, machinery shed & compound. Secure fence to Mulgoa Road erected to dissuade vandalism

== Heritage listing ==
As at 4 March 2005, Glenmore estate is an integral part of a relatively intact rural landscape developed by the pioneering Cox family in the early years of the colony of New South Wales, and subsequently throughout the 19th century. It is thus a physical record of the development of farming in Australia in general and the Mulgoa Valley in particular. The remnants of early exotic plantings include some of the finest specimens of their species in New South Wales.

The existing house and garden remnants at Glenmore are a substantial and rare surviving example of an early 19th century country residence, adapted for changing uses over time.

The estate is associated with significant personalities in state and local 19th century history, notably Henry Cox and James Riley.

There is archaeological significance in the potential evidence of other buildings and structures on the site. Because of the scarcity of documentary evidence about many aspects of the former homestead, the archaeological resource contains the only remaining evidence.

Glenmore has aesthetic values as a landmark on Mulgoa Road since its construction in 1825. The house and barn, associated large trees and setting, are located on a ridge and are visible from many places.

Areas or elements of exceptional significance include:

- underground spaces including cellars and sub-floor spaces, excluding modern services and alterations;
- all rooms in the main house and barn constructed before 1920.

Fabric of exceptional significance includes all extant fabric from the first stages of development except as noted elsewhere, and including:

- underground elements including courtyard well, external drains and other structures, excluding modern alternations and services;
- masonry elements including footings, walls, fireplaces, chimneys, verandah flagging and steps, constructed before 1920;
- structural timber elements including floor, roof and verandah framing (posts and beams, both decorated and plain) constructed before 1920;
- decorative timber elements and associated hardware constructed before 1920 (including elements relocated or removed), including eaves, doors, windows, shutters, architraves, skirtings and trims;
- plaster and render constructed before 1920 including wall and ceiling finishes, cornices and mouldings;
- cast iron fireplace surrounds and grates;
- landscape elements planted or constructed before 1920 including paths, driveways and mature trees and shrubs (refer to CMP for details).

Views and vistas of exceptional significance include:

- views of house, landscaping and outbuildings from Mulgoa Road;
- views from the main house towards the creek;
- views between the main house and the barn;
- approach to the main house and views of the house along the original driveway.

Fabric of considerable significance includes:

- galvanised steel roofing, roof plumbing and tanks installed prior to 1920;
- pressed metal ceilings and cornices.

Spaces and attributes of some significance include:

- storage rooms built on to kitchen;
- enclosure to rear verandah.

Fabric of some significance includes:

- landscape elements constructed or planted from 1930, including golf tees and greens;
- rainwater tanks and similar traditional items installed after 1920.

Glenmore is historically significant because:

1. it is an integral part of a relatively intact landscape consisting of a network of surviving rural properties from the 19th century, all intimately associated with the Cox family which demonstrates the landscape and developmental mechanisms of 19th century pastoralism in the Cumberland Plain;
2. It is one of the few surviving properties' houses from the very earliest period of development in the Mulgoa Valley;
3. It provides evidence of the development of the home farms in the district as centres of conspicuous consumption during the latter part of the 19th century;
4. It demonstrates the development of the Mulgoa Valley in the early 20th century as a tourist attraction, as a result of its historical and aesthetic appeal;
5. It is intimately associated with the Cox family, notable for their role in the early development of the colony;
6. It is associated with the Riley family, notable in the history of the Penrith district.

Glenmore was listed on the New South Wales State Heritage Register on 2 April 1999.

== See also ==
- List of heritage houses in Sydney
