= Ronald Campbell Maclachlan =

Brigadier-General Ronald Campbell Maclachlan DSO
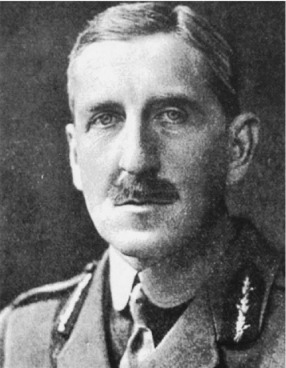
- Born: July 1872
- Died: 11 August 1917 (aged 45) Belgium

Brigadier-General Ronald Campbell Maclachlan, DSO (July 1872 – 11 August 1917) was a British Army officer. He was killed in action by a sniper in Belgium in 1917, while in command of the 112th Infantry Brigade.

== Military career ==
His military career began when he graduated from the Royal Military College, Sandhurst, in July 1893.
