= Fernhill, Mulgoa =

Fernhill
- Location within New South Wales

General information
- Status: Completed
- Type: Residence and horse stud; Former residence and gardens
- Architectural style: Old Colonial Greek Revival
- Location: 1041 Mulgoa Road, Mulgoa, New South Wales, Australia
- Coordinates: 33°49′31″S 150°38′19″E
- Construction started: c. 1830
- Completed: c. 1840
- Client: William Cox, and one of his sons, Edward

Technical details
- Grounds: 690 hectares (1,700 acres)

Design and construction
- Architects: Attributed: Mortimer Lewis, John Verge, or; Francis Clarke

Website
- www.fernhillestate.net.au

New South Wales Heritage Register
- Official name: Fernhill
- Type: State heritage (landscape)
- Criteria: a., c.
- Designated: 2 April 1999
- Reference no.: 54
- Type: Historic Landscape
- Category: Landscape - Cultural

Fernhill is a heritage-listed former chicken hatchery, plant nursery, guest house, farm, residence, stone mason's yard and piggery and now residence and horse stud located at 1041 Mulgoa Road, in the western Sydney suburb of Mulgoa, New South Wales, Australia. Completed in c. 1840 as a residence for Captain William Cox and family, the house was completed in the Old Colonial Greek Revival style with its design attributed to either Mortimer Lewis, John Verge or Francis Clarke. The property is privately owned. It was added to the New South Wales State Heritage Register on 2 April 1999.

Set on 690 hectares (1,700 acres), Fernhill was built as a much grander residence with associated gardens following Cox's earlier construction of The Cottage, that dated from c. 1810. Following Cox's death in 1837, Fernhill was completed under the supervision of one of his sons, Edward.

== History ==
=== Aboriginal land ===
The traditional owners of the land now occupied by Cox's Cottage were the Mulgowie people, who became known as the "Mulgoa tribe".

There is a reference to an attack on the Cox property by Aboriginal people in 1814.

=== Colonisation ===
The Mulgoa valley has played an important part in the history of the development of New South Wales. From 1810 Mulgoa was a key area of settlement in the colony.

The first land grant was made by Governor Macquarie to Lieutenant William Cox, a colonial magistrate who promptly registered the property in the parish records in the name of his infant son, Edward.

Cox's Cottage is part of early colonial land grants and purchases to members of the Cox family in the Mulgoa Valley, south of Penrith, eventually totalling some 1,522 hectares (3,760 acres). The first of the grants, of 12 hectares (30 acres), made in 1809 to the infant Edward Cox and confirmed by Governor Macquarie the following year, became known as Fernhills or Fernhill.

Fernhill estate is located principally on the first land grant made in the Mulgoa Valley (to the infant Edward Cox) dating back to 1809. The name Fern Hills seems to have been given it as early as 1810.

Lieutenant William Cox is perhaps best known for supervising the construction of the first road over the Blue Mountains in the second half of 1814. He sailed to New South Wales on the Minerva in 1799. During his 37 years of residence in the early colony, he made a substantial and enduring contribution to its progress in the fields of public administration, building and agricultural development. The Cox family were remarkable "house and garden" people. During the middle years of the 19th century, William Cox Sr. was at Clarendon, near Windsor; his eldest son William, lived at Hobartville, Richmond; his sons Henry, George and Edward were to build and occupy their respective houses of Glenmore, Winbourne and Fernhill at Mulgoa. Another son, James, settled in Van Dieman's Land, where he built his own magnificent Clarendon. Around all these houses the Cox families created beautiful gardens.

For some time the property of 134 hectares (330 acres) was managed jointly with that of William Cox by the overseer James King with occasional help from Cox's sons, George, Henry and Edward.

c. 1825 Edward Cox (1805–68) returned from schooling in England (since 1821) and established his separate estate at Fernhill. In 1827 he married Jane Maria Brooks (of Denham Court estate, Ingleburn) and the family lived at The Cottage, Mulgoa (to the east) for many years.

By the late 1830s Fernhill was one of the principal estates in the Mulgoa Valley and included The Cottage site to the east. At this time it was one of five properties that had expanded to occupy virtually the entire Mulgoa Valley.

In 1842 Edward Cox began building the sandstone house. It was planned on a large and sophisticated scale and in the Greek Revival style, possibly by colonial architect Mortimer Lewis. The house was completed in 1843 and Edward and Jane Cox moved in then. Above the door is a date of 1842. The architect of Fernhill is not known with any certainty. The house bears features suggestive of the work of Mortimer Lewis and John Verge. The less-well known architect, Francis Clarke, was working in the area at the time of Fernhill's construction and the house may have been designed by him.

Lewis' private commissions show a dependence on published sources, identified in recent year by architectural historian James Broadbent. Fernhill and Tomago boast separate entrance and garden fronts at right angles to each other, the garden fronts marked by bay windows. Their plans are probably adapted from the British architect William Wilkins' design for "Oxberton House", Nottinghamshire, as published by George Richardson in the New Vitruvius Britannicus (1802-8).

Elements of the house suggesting the involvement of Mortimer Lewis are: narrow "slit" side light windows flanking the front door; internal skirting boards with "window-panelling" insets; papier mache ceiling friezes and roses (from Bealerfeld & Co. in London) (much used in the 1840s, e.g. by Surveyor-General Sir Thomas Mitchell at Parkhall in Douglas Park; who influenced Lewis; and at Government House, Sydney (which Lewis supervised construction of) (NB: these were later removed and the ceilings stencilled); the "Gothic" black marble fireplace in the major room; the niches and arched vault openings in and off the entrance lobby (as at Garry Owen house in Lilyfield, by Lewis).

The house appears to have been designed as a two storey building. The recession of the 1840s is said to be the reason for its unfinished (one storey) state.

Twenty Irish stone masons were brought out to Australia under the bounty system of immigration for the specific purpose of building the Fernhill house, using sandstone quarried from the local hills. Edward Cox and his family lived in the house from 1843 until his death in 1868, when the property passed to his eldest son, Edward King Cox.

The surviving stable at the rear (west) is said to be built in 1839 and is certainly of the same period as the house.

In the early 1850s the estate was singled out by Governor FitzRoy's aide-de-camp, Col. Godfrey Mundy, for the way in which its landscape had been moulded by thinning the native species. Other ket developments include:

- c. 1860 – It was described as "a modern mansion situated on rising ground with well kept shrubberies, lawns and a well kept ... vineyard".
- Following Edward Cox's death in 1863 – the property passed to his eldest son, Edward King Cox (1829-1883) of Rawden, Mudgee, who until 1885 carried out at The Cottage, Mulgoa, a noted racehorse stud producing several Melbourne Cup winners. E. K. Cox was a breeder of fine race horses and Fernhill Stud produced the first Sydney Cup winner and several Melbourne Cup winners.
- Following E. K. Cox's death in 1883 the estate seems to have been divided.
- In 1888 – Standish Cox sold the house and surrounding land to Mr Wright of Wright Heaton. For some years possibly due to the recession of the 1890s the house is said to have been uninhabited.
- By 1911 – the property was owned by R. B. Baynes, Mayor of Mulgoa.
- About 1931 – the house and 1000 acres was bought by Mr & Mrs Moyse who ran it as a guest house. At that time the building had a galvanised iron roof and a large stone reservoir holding 45,000 gallons.
- c. 1965 – Mr John Darling bought the estate. Darling was a World War II fighter pilot, a banker, director of resource companies, accomplished international agri-business pioneer and Australian film industry visionary. After World War II Darling married Susie Yencken and they settled at Vaucluse. Weekends were often spent at Fernhill, Mulgoa, which Darling bought in 1956 and gradually restored.
- c. 1969 – Darling and garden designer Paul Sorensen reworked the garden around the house.
- In 1980 – the house was sold with 1000 acres to the property developer, Warren Anderson for $2.8 million.
- c. 1981 and earlier – the house was extensively restored and renovated by former owner Darling and then Anderson. The most notable addition has been the sandstone columns (ex the Union Club, Sydney) in the northern pergola.
- December 2001-January 2002 – bushfires damaged the property down to Mulgoa Road, but had some benefits in killing some of the cypress hedging obscuring/blocking views. Bushland is recovering.
- 2007-8 – Warren Anderson acquired adjoining properties on Fernhill's northern flank, lying uphill and visually prominent to its setting, when seen from the house/drives.
- 2010 – an auction of the collection (1400 lots, reputedly the largest such sale in Australia) of antiques, furniture and artworks belonging to the owners (Warren & Cheryl Anderson) held in June 2010.
- 2011 – property put on real estate market by receivers Korda Mentha.
- October 2012 – Simon & Brenda Tripp are tipped to buy (have put an option to buy) Fernhill for $45 million. The Tripps have been using the estate as a venue for functions, such as picnic race events on the racetrack, "Tough Mudder" endurance events, concerts and the like.

Fernhill has reputedly been sold for redevelopment as a cemetery. Rookwood General Cemetery Trust confirmed in May 2017 that a sale has not yet occurred, but it has entered into a six-month exclusivity period which will allow the trust to conduct the required due diligence process, commencing with a period of community consultation, the trust's spokeswoman told the Penrith Press.

== Description ==
=== Setting ===
Fernhill is in (on the western side of the middle of) the Mulgoa Valley, a picturesque rural landscape retaining a number of significant colonial and later 19th century farm estates, building complexes and areas of natural bushland. The valley is bounded to the west by the Nepean River and the Blue Mountains National Park, to the east it slopes down to Mulgoa Road and merges with the undulating slopes of Western Sydney. It is characterised by predominantly rural landscape and comprises creek flats, gently sloping agricultural land, wooded hills and escarpment areas.

=== Landscape ===
Fernhill is a consciously created rural landscape in the English landscape tradition, formed by:

- the process of elimination rather than planting;
- the removal of natives regarded as unpicturesque; and
- thinning to create a park like scene with clumps of rough-barked apples and Angophora trees left along the drive to the house.

Beyond the avenue of trees the drive crosses the wall of a dammed watercourse. The road continues across two small decorative but massively constructed balustraded bridges and winds upwards below the now partially obscured garden front of the house.

Significant elements are the hill setting of the house and original (southern) entrance drive including the drive, bridges, pond and estate landscaping in English landscape park style. The house, garden and modern works are not significant elements. Mundey's nineteenth century description of Fernhill's landscape being the finest piece of English park like scenery, but with Australian species, in New South Wales, is still arguably true.

=== Driveway ===
The original entrance drive was designed to provide visitors with constantly changing glimpses of the house and its estate. Two damaged but still trafficable sandstone arch bridges on the drive exist. They were unnecessary in an engineering sense as the drive could have been constructed higher up the hill to avoid the shallow gullies which the bridges cross. They were an obvious attempt by the designer to increase the grandeur of the entrance. This contrived landscape is an integral part of the setting of the house and outbuildings.

The drive is lined with avenue and specimens and clumps of rough-barked native apple or apple box/oak trees (Angophora intermedia, A.subvelutina, A.costata) contrived to offer occasional glimpses of Fernhill's house and St. Thomas' Church to the east, although the latter views are filtered by regenerating bush. The estate has many mature 19th century native trees, particularly Angophora trees or apple oaks.

Recent (c. 1980) stone faced walls and rail fences detract seriously from the historic quality of the planting.

The original drive went from the house to The (Cox's) Cottage (also once known as Fernhills/Fernhill) (east of the current Mulgoa Road alignment, facing the old Mulgoa Road (now renamed St.Thomas' Road).

The southern of two existing drives goes to the house from Mulgoa Road through (c. 1970/80) dry stone walls at the gates.

The northern drive c. 1970/80 is planted with an avenue of bloodwoods (Corymbia sp.) and runs in a relatively straight line up hill, compared to original (southern) driveway, with its carefully contrived bends to reveal views and hide them.

The northern of the two existing drives passes an orchard plantation area of pecan (Carya illinoiensis) trees and a large rock-faced stable structure to the north. It winds up hill past a large dam to its north and around another smaller dam/large pond to its south but still north of the house, approaching the house by a sloping driveway north-west of both the main house and a second, later house in sandstone with a verandah around it, set on a lower terrace. The drive also passes numerous outbuildings and yards to the west of the house on approach.

=== Dam on the northern drive ===
A large dam was formed by the drive crossing Littlefields Creek. Reportedly timber piling was removed in c. 1980 works and lined with (quite dramatic and tall) stone walling which has changed its character. The dam was probably original to the drive - it is shown on c. 1872 plan. It is a similar construction to the dam at The (Cox's) Cottage, Mulgoa to the east.

=== Stone bridges on southern / original drive ===
Includes two stone bridges and a dam - all shown on c. 1872 plan. Both are very fine ashlar sandstone bridges with buttresses, piers and capped parapets. Architectural design. Both were in poor order (1981) with their downhill sides collapsing. These were presumably built before the house as second storey of house did not eventuate.

=== Garden ===
North of the main house and between it and the newer second house on a lower terrace to the north (built by Warren Anderson) are a grove of pecan (Carrya illinoiensis) trees, a boundary planting of olives (Olea europaea cv.).

Around the original house is a garden dating from the 1840s, much of it re-designed/planted) by garden designer Paul Sorensen around c. 1969. The garden's early configuration is now obscured (1981 and 2002 observations), but critical elements of early planting survive as setting for the historic house. Old and substantial exotic or non-locally native trees including bunya pines (Araucaria bidwillii), stone pines (Pinus pinea), and Chinese elms (Ulmus parvifolia) remain. Other exotic trees of note include coral trees (Erythrina sp.), pistachios (Pistacia sp.), olives (Olea europaea cv.).

The Sorensen garden redesign includes terracing to the house's south with a swimming pool on the lower terrace, a long pergola edging a lawn to the house's north edged with trees (including olives and cypresses). A lawn to the east slopes to a large oval pond on the far (east) side of which runs one drive to the house.

In 1969 owner John Darling hired garden designer Paul Sorensen to construct a garden around the house. At that time photographs showed little "development" around the house apart from the carriage loop and dramatic views. Darling and Sorensen were both keen to provide a setting both sympathetic to the house and suitable for modern outdoor living.

Planting then was limited to two jacaranda trees (Jacaranda mimosifolia), one bunya pine, a few smaller trees and a row of struggling Nile/ African lilies (Agapanthus praecox ssp. orientalis). The immediate land was littered with farm structures, tank stands, castor oil bushes and dead wattles. Cattle were roaming through parts of the house at the time.

Sorensen and the Darlings created level lawns around the house by building retaining walls and lots of fill. This in turn required replanning the carriage loop, which was buried in the process of filling. This was replaced with a car court hidden below a retaining wall to the north-east of the house with an approach stair arriving at lawn level near a grove of Chinese elms at the end of an enormous pergola. In this pergola Sorensen (/Darling) reused old architectural elements, sandstone columns from the Union Club, Bligh Street, Sydney (demolished in the early 1960s to build the Wentworth Hotel). These were erected as supports for the heavy timber pergola over which white Wisteria sinensis "Alba" was planted. This pergola design was very refined, with the timber ends fashioned in a detail sympathetic to the Georgian architecture of the house.

A wide bed of mixed plantings of perennials and shrubs, including camellias and azaleas, forms a backdrop to the pergola when viewed from the house, adding a floral display at this important arrival point to the house.

A swimming pool was installed south of the house, sited so it cannot be seen from the house, even though it is on the central southern axis (bay). It was set at a lower level below a balustraded wall. While flowering shrubs were planted for further screening. A pool house was set below the adjoining upper terrace and is invisible from other parts of the garden.

Hedges were planted as an important garden feature. The rose garden is screened by tall hedges of star jasmine (Trachelospermum jasminoides) with the entrance being arched with yellow banksia rose (Rosa banksiae 'Lutea'). Star jasmine was also used to screen a new tennis court to the southwest.

The garden was nowhere near complete when Darling sold Fernhill to Owston Nominees (Warren Anderson), who continued to use Sorensen's services. Later works included provision of an ornamental pool (the dam with island east of the house) and the transplanting of an ancient evergreen magnolia/bull bay (Magnolia grandiflora) from Sydney into the garden.

Much recent (1981) planting and the introduction of unsympathetic landscape elements (walls, gazebo on island in recent dam east of house), etc obscure the significance of the setting and obstruct original panoramic views from the house. Extensive planting of cypress hedges further block views out/in particularly to/from the north - these were damaged in the 2001/2 summer bushfires.

Shrubs in the garden include a pomegranate (Punica granatum) west of the house, and an area of formal roses on a terrace below and north-west of the house.

=== House ===
Fernhill is a single storey ashlar sandstone house. There is a central semi-circular bay on the south-eastern elevation, with a stone flagged verandah, curved timber rafters and the roof of which is supported by stone Doric columns. The extensive cellar features a stone cantilevered stairway. The windows and the entrance on the north-eastern elevation suggest that a verandah along that side of the house was planned but never built. Interior ceilings are lofty as the house was originally designed for two-storeys. Window sills are hewn from the wall of masonry, rather than being separate blocks of stone.

The stone-flagged entrance hall has flattened corners containing round-headed niches which flank the opening into the central hall.

Very fine cedar joinery and papier mache ceiling ornamentation. Also very fine Italian style chimney pieces. All of the living rooms feature elegant architraves. Interior ceilings are lofty as house was originally designed for two storeys. Roof is of corrugated iron.

Elements of the house suggesting the involvement of Mortimer Lewis are: narrow "slit" side light windows flanking the front door; internal skirting boards with "window-panelling" insets; papier mache ceiling friezes and roses (from Bealerfeld & Co. in London) (much used in the 1840s, e.g. by Surveyor-General Sir Thomas Mitchell at Parkhall in Douglas Park; who influenced Lewis; and at Government House, Sydney (which Lewis supervised construction of) (NB: these were later removed and the ceilings stencilled); the "Gothic" black marble fireplace in the major room; the niches and arched vault openings in and off the entrance lobby (as at Garry Owen house in Lilyfield, by Lewis).

=== Wings / Officers' courtyard / Two stone garden walls ===
Off the western side of house, joined to its two wings (these are remnants of original officers' courtyard of house) are two stone garden walls - both bent i.e.: cornered - one at right angles. Coursed colonial rubble walls of bush stone. Shaped coping of smaller stones, includes gateway to stable (west of house).

=== Stables and coach house ===
A sandstone building from c. 1839 is located behind (west of) the main house. A drive runs between it and the house, accessed by a flight of stone steps and terraced lawn and garden areas. The building is thought to be a stable and coach house, with fine face sandstone construction, mostly original openings, coach house door original, roof and all other joinery and finishes are c. 1980.

Facing it across the drive are lemons (Citrus limon) espaliered against wide trellis mounted on walls, likely to have been put in by Sorensen.

=== Stone box drain ===
Substantial drain with dished bottom and stone sides and top running from back (west) of house under south end of old stable. Possibly main cellar drain. Reportedly discovered in works c. 1980.

=== Orchard ===
South of the stables and coach house is a hedged sloping area planted with fruit trees. Two large old sweet bay / bay laurel trees (Laurus nobilis) are the oldest surviving plants here.

=== Winery ruin ===
West of house and stable/ coach house. Coursed and rubble sandstone walls, approximately 14 by 8 metres (46 by 26 ft), originally two stories high. Contained (1981) some old iron machinery including a large (boiling down?) pot. Divided into two rooms, the larger with a two storey space. Except for the dividing wall, the walls are now (1981) reduced to approx. 2.5 metres (8 ft 2 in) height and the sunken floors are filled with rubble. Said to be a winery. There is some documentary evidence of vineyards at Fernhill notes a "well kept vineyard".

The property retains most of its rural landscape character including a strong historical and visual relationship with the Cox family's earlier house Mulgoa Cottage and church, St. Thomas' Church of England. The three buildings were originally linked by tree-lined drives, the remains of which bear evidence of an attempt by Cox to create an English-style rural landscape in an Australian setting. The native trees of the area include Angophora subvelutina, a species which approximates the English Oak in size and habit.

=== Condition ===
Despite modifications, the overall physical condition is good. Archaeological potential is low.

- House renovated and restored c. 1980.
- Park: well maintained as grazing land but a systematic replanting scheme is necessary.
- Bridges: in need of restoration.
- The final approach to the house has been altered by the removal (covering up) of the carriage loop and the construction of a garden by Paul Sorensen.
- The swimming pool interrupts the view from the front garden.
- Ruin of winery, c. 1840s - ruins of walls and machinery, sunken floors;
- Miscellaneous drains and walls, c. 1840 - generally stone; some only recently revealed.

=== Modifications and dates ===
- 1840 – Construction completed
- 1930s – Addition to north-west wing.
- 1950s – Original timber porte cochere over front door on eastern facade removed
- Late 1950s – Lawn lowered and extended as a terrace.
- 1962 – Restoration work undertaken to house - replacement of termite damaged beams with steel beams "where concealed", in roof and floor structure. Floor boards lifed and relaid on new joists where needed. Ceilings replaced throughout. All papier mache mouldings and enrichments were photographed, removed, and refixed to new ceilings. Moulds used to replace unusable sections.

Galvanised iron roof sheeting replaced with slate, slosest approximation to the original shingle roof (stripped c. 1890). Galvanised iron guttering replaced with copper of same ogee section. External shutters repaired with louvre blades, stiles and rails renewed as needed. Sham porte cochere (timber and flat sheeting) added c. 1900 was removed (in poor repair with termites), showing up the original arched stone entrance. (Peddle Thorp and Walker for Mr John Darling).

- 1966 – Subdivision approved of two lots - a residue lot of 926 acres, and a 25 acre curtilage around house and right of way from Mulgoa Road of varying width (amending the 1960 proclamation of 6 acres of Fernhill as a historic building under the County of Cumberland Planning Scheme/place of historic interest in the Penrith Planning Scheme Ordinance, which included the driveway).
- Late 1950s-1969 – Then owner Mr Darling and landscape gardener Paul Sorensen undertook extensive garden remodelling close to the house, including filling above the original carriage loop (now a terrace with retaining walls), a swimming pool and tennis court south of the house, large pergola (re-using sandstone columns salvaged from the demolished Union Club in Bligh Street, Sydney (site of the now Wentworth Hotel), extensive shrub planting closer to the house, and dam to the east of the house.

The swimming pool, while not visible from the house (it is at a lower level), interrupts the view of the garden front and the views previously available over the carriage loop to the entire property to the east. Sorensen work included thinning of existing plantings and relocation of many existing shrubs, laying of concrete for a ha-ha wall on the west of the old entrance drive to the east of the house.

- c. 1970 – Coach house and stables renovated as stables and dwelling. Renovated c. 1982 to remove dwelling and add further verandahs.
- 6 December 1979 – Subdivision approved of 49.8 hectares (of the 374.9 hectares) in the north-east of the property, for ownership transfer within the Darling family/estate purposes. Land used for horticultural purposes in the form of water storage and plant nursery developments, includes part of the right of way to access house.
- c. 1980 – House renovated and restored.
- c. 1979-81 – Two owners, Mr Darling and Mr Anderson (who acquired Fernhill in 5/1980), undertook extensive upgrading and new construction works, including extensive stone faced walls, one along the entire length of the original entrance drive to the house and abutting the stone bridges on the slope to the house, others lining key roads, stone faced entrance piers on the original driveway to Mulgoa Road, stone facing to the old farm dam on the original (southern) entrance driveway and a new road over its new dam wall, several farm buildings, outbuildings west of the house including a games room, tennis court, a barn (sic) on a new (1980) northern driveway to Mulgoa Road, an aviary, racecourse with horse rail fencing, later deer fencing).

Main house walls, manager's residence, garage stone walls and part of the stone retaining walls were high-pressure jet-water-cleaned. New dam constructed on northern side of northern (new) access road. Application to Penrith Council for a nursery on site. Air-conditioning installed in house, leading to some deterioration in sandstone in the cellars.

- c. 1981 – Grading of original (southern) entrance drive, clearing of trees, ripping of areas around house, construction of large dam north-east of house, including diversion of main entrance drive away from the house over the new dam wall. New caretaker's house erected to north-east of the house in the style of Experiment Farm cottage, Parramatta.
- Work to address house's/ cellar's rising damp, and remove paint from cedar joinery. Repointing of stonework in cellar. Rebuilding (owner's assertion)/erection (in the Heritage Council's view) of "existing" buildings for games room, alterations to existing stables building, workshop, machinery shed, brick bull shed & silo, erection of gardener's cottage, stone huts in surrounding paddocks, retaining wall and levelling.
- Existing sheds and other structures north of the house used as nursery removed, and in 1983 approval given for new stables block (58x27m), mating shed, lunging ring and sand roll to the north-west of the house.
- c. 1980 – 1990 – Extensive cypress hedging planted along fencelines to add privacy to house?/shelter for horses - but also obscuring and blocking important views/vistas. New dam constructed on western hilly section of the property.
- 2 August 1984 – Approved a small extension to house service sing for new laundry facilities, and to remove an existing accretion.
- 2 July 1987 – Heritage Council commenced legal proceedings for second instance of substantial unapproved works undertaken on property. (Second instance was stables to east of house – about halfway between house and Mulgoa Road) (First instance was rebuilding (owner's assertion)/Erection (Heritage Council's view) of "existing" buildings for games room, alterations to existing stables building, workshop, machinery shed, brick bull shed and silo, erection of gardener's cottage, stone huts in surrounding paddocks, retaining wall and levelling.)
- December 2001 – January 2002 – Bushfires damaged the property down to Mulgoa Road, but some benefits in killing some of the cypress hedging obscuring/blocking views. Bushland recovering.
- December 2012 – Simon and Brenda Tripp are tipped to have bought (have an option to buy) Fernhill for $45m.

== Heritage listing ==
The Fernhill estate comprises an extensive area of modified and natural landscape which provides the setting for a house completed c.1845 for Edward Cox.

The Fernhill estate features a unique landscape design and well-crafted Greek Revival architecture. Situated in the Mulgoa Valley, it holds significant historical value in New South Wales.

a unique phase in Australia's history with the rise of the landed pastoral estates, in this instance developed by Edward Cox and his son Edward King Cox (Paul Davies, 2005).

The importance of Fernhill as a group of related sites (along with St. Thomas' Church, Mulgoa, and the Cottage, Mulgoa) is twofold: the landscape is exceptionally significant in its own right irrespective of the buildings, and is as important as the architectural, historic and visual relationships of the buildings themselves.

These three sites retain their original visual relationship to each other, demonstrating the ambitions and changes in wealth and status of an early colonial family (the Coxes) from 1810-1880s. The landscape between the Cottage, the Church and Fernhill has remained unaltered since the 1850s. This landscape is a unique piece of evidence of a very rare attitude in the mid-nineteenth century towards the natural environment.

Fernhill's landscape extends generally from Mulgoa Creek in the east to beyond the ridge of bush behind Fernhill house in the west, from Littlefields Creek in the south to Mayfields Road in the north.

Fernhill setting is an extensive area of modified landscape providing a picturesque approach to the historic Homestead. The landscape is significant for the high degree of creative design achievement, attributed to the original owner, Edward Cox.

It is historically significant for the following reasons:

- the landscape is a rare Australian example of the English landscape school's design technique which modified existing landscapes to create a romanticised natural appearance;
- the landscape demonstrates a cultural phase in Australia when landscape design was influenced by the teaching of Thomas Shepherd who advocated the adaptation of the English design technique.

The landscape contains a richness of cultural features such as:

- long vistas to the Homestead;
- vistas to St. Thomas' (the family) Church spire from the Homestead;
- use of water as a foreground for vistas and views;
- ornamental bridges to articulate enframed views;

and clumps of trees carefully created by thinning of native bushland (RNE)

Fernhill is possibly the only intact early colonial garden laid out on the principles of the English Landscape Garden (a landscape "Park" in the picturesque manner) but relying entirely on indigenous plant material and the process of elimination (thinning and tree removal) rather than planting (Broadbent, J., for the National Trust of Australia (NSW) 1981).

Fernhill's remnant exotic trees of the 19th century garden (Bunyas, stone pines, Chinese elms) around the house and the remnant garden layout is considered a landscape drive.

Fernhill was probably one of the last buildings completed in the Colonial period of New South Wales architecture. It was the home of Edward Cox, son of William Cox, and as such is intimately linked with much of the early rural development of the colony. Fernhill property retains most of its rural landscape character, including a visual relationship with the Cox family's earlier house Mulgoa Cottage and church, St Thomas' Church of England.

Fernhill was constructed of stone quarried on the site and was probably one of the last buildings to be completed in the noble colonial period. It was at this time that the Greek and Romantic Revival period commenced in which the buildings were constructed of imported materials. (RNE).

Believed to be possibly the finest extant Greek Revival temple house in New South Wales

The fact that the house was not completed (it is single storey, and was apparently to be two storied) makes it physical evidence of the depression of the 1840s. Perhaps most significant is its siting. In the truly picturesque sense, it is sited like a Greek temple, on an acropolis of a site, to command the country for miles around. It is also significant as the home of a prominent settler, Edward Cox.

Fernhill (Sydney) was listed on the New South Wales State Heritage Register on 2 April 1999 having satisfied the following criteria.

The place is important in demonstrating the course, or pattern, of cultural or natural history in New South Wales.

Fernhill was probably one of the last buildings completed in the Colonial period of New South Wales architecture. It was the home of Edward Cox, son of William Cox, and as such is intimately linked with much of the early rural development of the colony.

The place is important in demonstrating aesthetic characteristics and/or a high degree of creative or technical achievement in New South Wales.

Fernhill property retains most of its rural landscape character, including a visual relationship with the Cox family's earlier house Mulgoa Cottage and church, St Thomas' Church of England.

== Residents and owners ==
The various residents and owners of Fernhill have been:

- William Cox, 1830 – 1837
- Edward Cox, 1837 – 1868
- Edward King Cox, 1868 – 1883
- Standish Cox, 1883 – 1896
- Francis Augustus Wright, 1896 – ????
- Warren Anderson, 1980 – 2012
- Simon and Brenda Tripp, 2012 –
- Government of New South Wales, 2018 –

In 2017 there were plans by the Rookwood Cemetery Trust to acquire grounds surrounding the homestead for the purposes of creating a new cemetery in western Sydney. Amidst significant community opposition, the NSW Government declined planning approval for a cemetery on Fernhill. In early 2018 the estate was bought by the NSW Office of Strategic Lands of the NSW government.

== Popular culture ==
The finale of season three of The Bachelor was filmed at Fernhill.

== See also ==
- Australian residential architectural styles
