= James Norton (solicitor) =

Australian politician

- Born: 27 July 1795; Hastings, Sussex, England
- Died: 31 August 1862 (aged 67); Leichhardt, New South Wales
- Occupations: Attorney, solicitor, farmer, horticulturist, legislator
- Years active: 1818–1860
- Known for: Founding first law firm in Australia
- Political party: Protectionist

James Norton Sr. (27 July 1795 – 31 August 1862) was a solicitor and public figure in early colonial New South Wales. Admitted to practise in England, he arrived in Sydney in September 1818 where only four other attorneys were then practising. He was the founder of the first law firm in Sydney. He was a member of the first Legislative Council under responsible government in New South Wales in 1856, and drafted numerous laws. He held land at Mulgoa which was farmed and owned Elswick, a 30 ha estate in what is now Leichhardt where he grew prize flowers and plants. He was a leading Sydney member of the Anti-Transportation League and a protectionist in whose cause he published a series of pamphlets.

== From Sussex to Sydney ==
James Norton was born on 27 July 1795 in Hastings, Sussex, England. After legal training, he was admitted as an attorney. Signing on as captain's clerk, he arrived at Port Jackson in September 1818 per the Maria with capital of £800. He joined a small legal profession in Sydney: the list of the attorneys of the colony in the New South Wales Pocket Almanac for 1819 read "Thomas Wylde Esq, W H Moore Esq, Frederic Garling Esq, T S Amos Esq, and James Norton Esq."

== Mulgoa farmer ==
His father, John, a brother, Nathathiel, and three sisters joined him in Sydney. On 6 April 1821, three large land grants were made at Mulgoa to the Norton family: John Norton was granted 800 acres (320 ha) which he called Goves; Nathaniel Norton, 800 acres (320 ha), Fairlight; and James Norton, 950 acres (380 ha), Northend which he farmed. His youngest sister, Emma (1798–1885), married the explorer John Oxley in August 1822.

== Legal practice ==
Norton created Australia's first law firm in 1826 when he formed the partnership, Norton and Barker with William Barker. Before the legal profession in New South Wales was divided in 1829, he appeared as counsel for the Crown in a number of significant cases. His son, James Norton Jr. was articled in the same law firm.

== Honours and awards ==
The main street of Leichhardt is named in his honour. The 30 hectare Elswick estate was bounded by Parramatta Road, Norton Street, Marion Street and Elswick Street, Leichhardt; in 1882, it was sub-divided and offered as 600 lots.

== Publications ==
- Essays and reflections in Australia, (using pseudonym "a layman"), 1852–1853
- The constitution question, 1853
- Port Jackson and the City of Sydney, 1853
- Further observations on the resurrection of the body, (using pseudonym "a layman"), 1854
- Australian essays on subjects political, moral, and religious, 1857
- Free trade and protection, 1857
- Facts for the protectionists, 1857
- The condition of the colony of New South Wales, 1860
