= Edward King Cox =

Australian politician

- Born: June 28, 1829; Mulgoa
- Died: July 25, 1883 (aged 54); Mulgoa
- Burial place: St Thomas, Mulgoa

Edward King Cox (28 June 1829 – 25 July 1883) was an Australian politician.

He was born in Mulgoa to pastoralist Edward Cox, who would also serve in the New South Wales Parliament, and Jane Maria Brooks. He studied sheep breeding in Britain and Europe and in 1855 took charge of his father's properties. On 19 May 1855 he married Millicent Ann Standish, with whom he had six children. He inherited his father's property (Cox's Cottage) in 1868, and achieved great success breeding merino sheep. He also bred horses, including Chester, which won the 1877 Melbourne Cup, and Grand Flaneur, which won the 1880 Melbourne Cup. In 1874 he was appointed to the New South Wales Legislative Council, where he served until his death in Mulgoa in 1883.
