= Edward Cox (Australian politician) =

Australian politician

- Born: England
- Died: 18 May 1868; Goulburn, New South Wales
- Burial place: St Thomas, Mulgoa
- Children: Edward King Cox
- Father: William Cox

Edward Cox (died 18 May 1868) was an English-born Australian politician.

He was the son of military officer William Cox and Rebecca Upjohn, and he migrated to New South Wales in 1800 with his family. He married Jane Maria Brooks; a son, Edward King Cox, would also serve in the New South Wales Parliament. Edward Cox inherited the semi-complete Fernhill at Mulgoa from his father, and also had a number of squatting properties. He was a non-elective member of the New South Wales Legislative Council from 1851 to 1855, and a member of the reconstituted Council from 1866 until his death in 1868.
