= Mulgoa =

- Suburb
- Interactive map of Mulgoa
- Country: Australia
- State: New South Wales
- City: Sydney
- LGA: Penrith City Council
- Location: 66 km (41 mi) west of Sydney CBD; 14 km (8.7 mi) south of Penrith

Government
  - State electorate: Badgerys Creek
  - Federal division: Lindsay

Area
  - Total: 55.5 km^{2} (21.4 sq mi)
- Elevation: 75 m (246 ft)

Population
  - Total: 2,044 (2021 census)
  - Density: 36.83/km^{2} (95.39/sq mi)
- Postcode: 2745
Suburbs around Mulgoa
Lapstone	Regentville	Glenmore Park
Blue Mountains National Park	Mulgoa	Orchard Hills
Warragamba Dam	Wallacia	Luddenham

Mulgoa is a village, located in the local government area of the City of Penrith, in the region of western Sydney, in the state of New South Wales, Australia. Mulgoa is located approximately 66 kilometres (41 mi) west of the Sydney central business district.

Mulgoa covers an area of 5,530 hectares (13,700 acres), south of the Penrith suburbs of Regentville and Glenmore Park.

== History ==
=== Aboriginal culture ===
Mulgoa takes its name from the Mulgoa people, who were an Aboriginal Australian people, the Indigenous inhabitants of the area who spoke the Dharug language. The name is believed to mean "black swan". The Mulgoa were not the only inhabitants of the area; they shared the Mulgoa Valley with the Gandangara people of the Southern Highlands, whose territory extended up into the Blue Mountains. The Aboriginal peoples mostly lived a hunter-gatherer lifestyle governed by traditional laws, which had their origins in their mythology known as The Dreaming. Their homes were bark huts called gunyah. They hunted kangaroos and emus for meat, and gathered yams, berries and other native plants.

=== European settlement ===
Following the arrival of the First Fleet in Sydney, there were a number of bloody battles between the British settlers and the local Indigenous people in this area, however, it is believed that the Mulgoa people were generally peaceful and most of the clashes were with the Gandangara. The first government land grants in the area were made in 1810 to Edward Cox, the four-year-old son of Captain William Cox, who constructed a famous road across the Blue Mountains in 1814. William Cox built The Cottage on the land in about 1811. Fernhill, a much grander residence with associated gardens, now heritage-listed, was completed in the 1840s, although the proposed second-storey was never added. Not far away dwelt Cox's friend Sir John Jamison, who erected the colony's finest mansion, Regentville House, in 1824, on an eminence overlooking the Nepean River. In 1821, three large land grants were made on the Nepean at Mulgoa to the Norton family: James Norton, the founder of Sydney's first law firm and his father and brother, Nathaniel.

The centre of Mulgoa's spiritual life in the colonial era was St Thomas' Anglican Church, which dates from 1838. It was the first public building in the Mulgoa Valley and was constructed out of sandstone and cedar on paddocks donated by the Cox family, with Sir John Jamison serving as one of its patrons. The Reverend Thomas Cooper Makinson was St Thomas' inaugural rector. Attached to the church was Mulgoa's first school which operated until 1871–72, when the Mulgoa Provisional School replaced it.

In 1893, Mulgoa's population was sufficiently large to be granted the status of a municipality. Its area extended beyond the current suburb boundaries. In 1949, however, council rationalisations led to it merging with Penrith, St Marys and Castlereagh into a larger Penrith Municipality. These days, Mulgoa is still primarily a rural area.

Mulgoa Post Office opened on 1 September 1863.

=== 20th century ===
In May 1942, during the Second World War and after the bombing of Darwin, a group of Aboriginal children were evacuated from "The Bungalow" in Alice Springs, Northern Territory to an Anglican home Mulgoa. The group included Rona and Freda Glynn, as well as John Kundereri Moriarty.

The Church Missionary Society Home for Half-Castes existed between 1942 and 1947, run by the Church Missionary Society. It housed Aboriginal children aged 1–14, and some mothers, who came mainly from South Australia, the Northern Territory and Queensland, with a few from New South Wales. They were evacuated by the Department of Native Affairs, under military orders. However the group of children did not leave Mulgoa until January 1949.

=== Heritage listings ===
Mulgoa has a number of heritage-listed sites, including:

- Fairlight Road: Fairlight Homestead
- Mulgoa Road: Fernhill, Mulgoa
- 754-760 Mulgoa Road: Glenmore, Mulgoa
- St Thomas Road: St Thomas' Anglican Church, Mulgoa
- 2 St Thomas Road: Cox's Cottage

== Transport ==
Mulgoa Road is the main road in the suburb, connecting with Penrith. Busways provides a bus route 795 which runs from Warragamba to Penrith along Mulgoa Road.

The iconic Mulgoa speedhump is known amongst the locals for its inability to slow cars down.

== Education ==
There is a government-run primary school, Mulgoa Public School, and a privately run school, Nepean Christian School.

== Demographics ==
The recorded population of Mulgoa in the 2021 census was 2,044. The majority of residents are Australian born (81.6%) with small minorities born in England (2.4%), Malta (1.7%), and Germany (1.3%). The most common responses for religion were Catholic 41.4%, No Religion 20.2% and Anglican 19.8%. There are a large number of couples with children (54.8%) and most houses are owned outright (45.5%) or being paid off (39.0%). The number of renters (13.7%) was substantially less than the national average of 30.6%. The median household income ($2,533 per week) was higher than the national average ($1,746).

== Notable residents ==
- Stuart Ayres, former New South Wales Minister for Jobs, Investment, Tourism and Western Sydney
- Edward Cox, a son of William Cox, and politician; and his son, Edward King Cox, also a politician.
- Captain William Cox (1764–1837), Mulgoa pioneer, military officer, landowner and road-builder.
- Robert Dulhunty (1803–1853), landowner, police magistrate, alderman and founder of the Dubbo district in central-western New South Wales.
- Sir John Jamison Kt, MD (1776–1844), landowner, physician and Member of the Legislative Council of New South Wales.
- The Reverend Thomas Cooper Makinson (1809–1893), Mulgoa's first resident Anglican clergyman and schoolmaster, who later converted to Catholicism.
- Emmanuel Margolin, entrepreneur and former operator of El Caballo Blanco, which contained Sydney's largest private zoo.
- Senator The Honourable Marise Payne, former federal Foreign Affairs Minister
- David Stove (1927-1994), philosopher.

== Governance ==
At a local government level, Mulgoa is part of the south ward of Penrith City Council, represented by Jim Aitken, Mark Davies, Sue Day, Karen McKeown and Mark Rusev. The current mayor is Tricia Hitchen. At the state level, it is part of the Electoral district of Badgerys Creek, represented by Tanya Davies, of the Liberal Party. Federally, it is part of the Division of Lindsay, and represented by Liberal Melissa McIntosh.
