= Bernwood Forest =

Forest in Buckinghamshire, England

Coordinates: 51°47′42″N 1°06′18″W

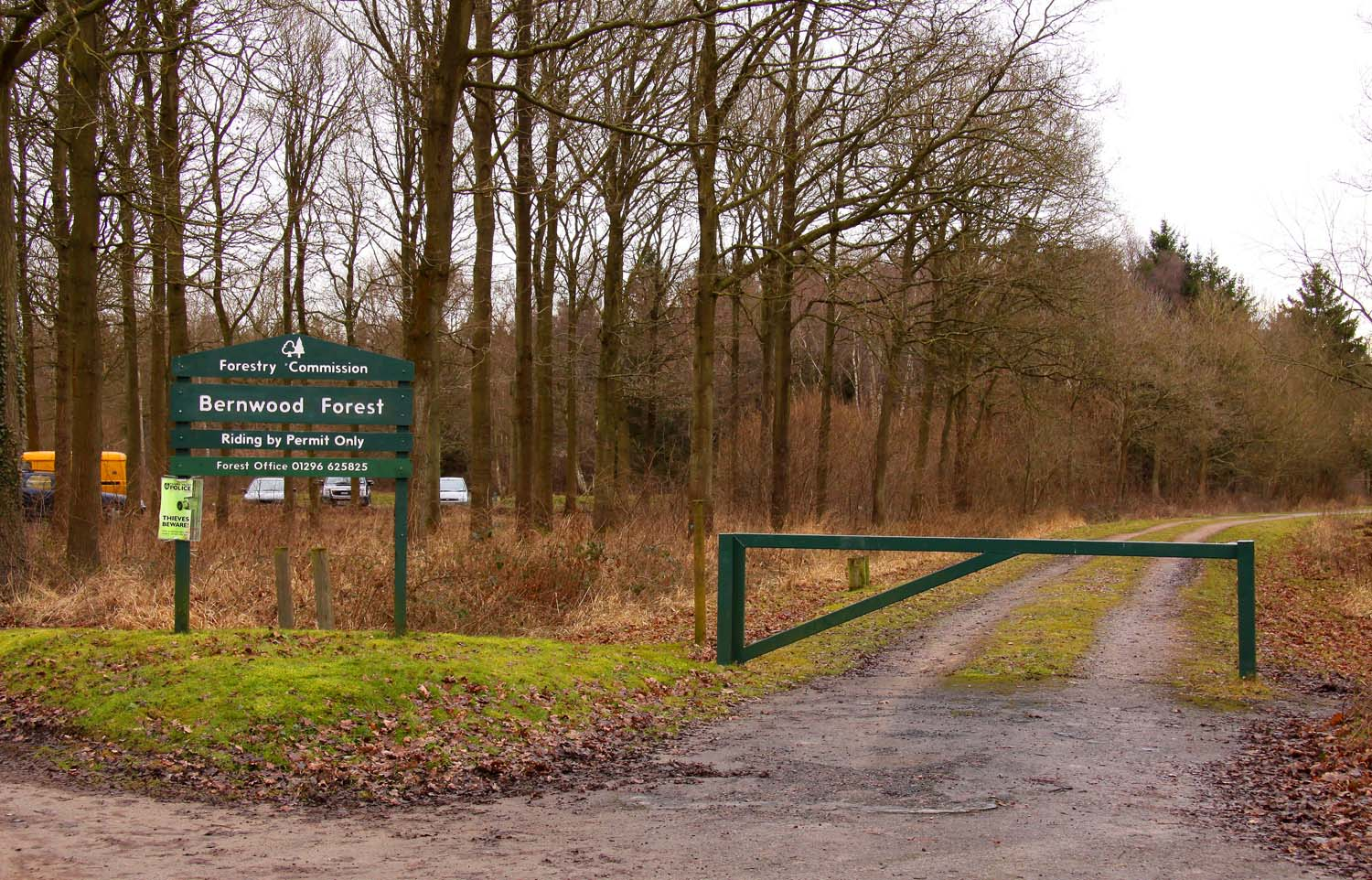
Entrance to Bernwood Forest

Bernwood Forest is a forest in England. Historically it was one of several forests of the ancient Kingdom of England and was a Royal hunting forest. It is thought to have been set aside as Royal hunting land when the Anglo-Saxon kings had a palace at Brill and church in Oakley, in the 10th century and was a particularly favoured place of Edward the Confessor, who was born in nearby Islip.

From about 1217 through to the 17th century the forest went through a gradual period of deforestation. King Henry II (reigned 1154–1189) prepared a map of the forest at the time which is an invaluable tool in helping define its ancient boundaries; however, his purpose for drawing up the map was to divide the forest amongst his nobles. By the 16th century, another map of the forest had been drawn up by which time it had been reduced greatly in size. Again, the map was drawn up under the aegis of the Crown as an audit to what revenue could be made from selling off the forest. By the reign of King James I (reigned 1603–1625), the forest had lost its Royal status and had completely disappeared.

Today the name refers to the area of Buckinghamshire and Oxfordshire where the forest was at the time of King Henry II, covering 400 km². The approximate boundaries of the designated area today fall within the River Great Ouse, the Padbury Brook, the Claydon Brook and the River Thame.

The small modern Bernwood Forest in Buckinghamshire is approximately 1 km² and is contiguous with Hell Coppice, York's Wood, Oakley Wood and Shabbington Wood. (Note: Google Maps over-labels the nearby Waterperry Woods as Bernwood Forest. The accurate view is represented by the Ordnance Survey maps (OS maps) displayed by Streetmap, which groups Oakley Wood, Shabbington Wood, York's Wood and Hell Coppice as Bernwood Forest.) A Site of Special Scientific Interest (SSSI) called Shabbington Woods Complex, it supports a wide variety of wildlife and is one of the most important butterfly sites in the United Kingdom. Its manager, Forestry England, originally had a more commercial approach. Aerial spraying of pesticides was carried out until the late 1960s: firstly DDT to control Hylobius abietis then 2,4,5-T to clear broad-leafed plants (including oak saplings) before planting commercial pine stands.

Holly Wood, Holton Wood, Stanton Great Wood and Waterperry Wood, all in Oxfordshire, and Ham Home-cum-Hamgreen Woods in Buckinghamshire, are also remnants of Bernwood Forest which are SSSIs. Another fragment in Buckinghamshire is Rushbeds Wood, an SSSI which is managed by the Berkshire, Buckinghamshire and Oxfordshire Wildlife Trust.
