= Kingswood, Buckinghamshire =

Hamlet in Buckinghamshire, England

Coordinates: 51.8652°N 0.9985°W

Kingswood
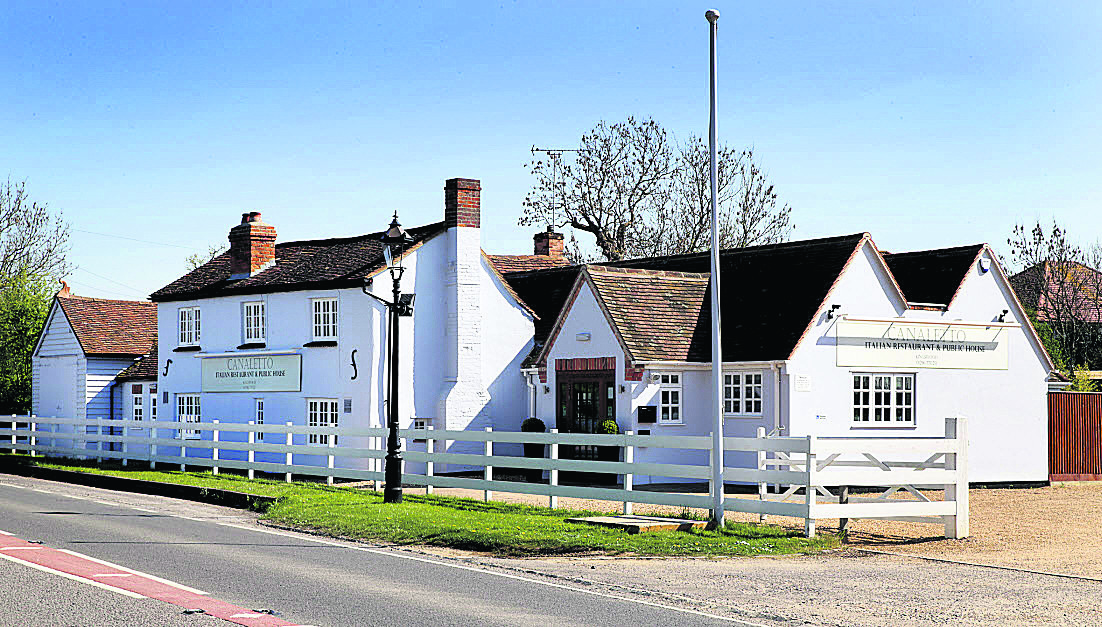
- Restaurant and Public House

- Location within Buckinghamshire
- Population: 149 (2011 Census including Woodham)
- OS grid reference: SP693189
- Unitary authority: Buckinghamshire
- Ceremonial county: Buckinghamshire
- Region: South East
- Country: England
- Sovereign state: United Kingdom
- Post town: AYLESBURY
- Postcode district: HP18
- Dialling code: 01296
- Police: Thames Valley
- Fire: Buckinghamshire
- Ambulance: South Central
- UK Parliament: Mid Buckinghamshire

Kingswood is a hamlet of 30 dwellings on the south side of the A41 from Waddesdon to Bicester and between the villages of Ludgershall and Grendon Underwood in Buckinghamshire, England. Kingswood is also a civil parish within Aylesbury Vale area. Parish matters are currently administered via parish meeting.

The Village Hall blew down in the Great Storm of 1987.

== Etymology ==
The hamlet name refers to the nearby Bernwood Forest, an ancient royal hunting forest.

== Description ==
The houses within the hamlet form part of a larger community encompassing a further 30 dwellings within adjoining parishes. Kingswood includes a burial ground, a public house and a Mission Hall at the crossroads built around 1850 and left in trust in 1905 by Henry Grattan Guinness (1835–1910) for the salvation or edification of souls. There is a Site of Special Scientific Interest, Ham Home-cum-Hamgreen Woods.

== History ==
The old Roman Akeman Street was the main route to Cirencester, Cheltenham and Bath and the Crooked Billet, an important coaching inn / staging post.

The original trustees of the Mission Hall were William Kirby, Sydney Hopcroft, James & John Taylor and William Wellings. Adjoining land was then owned by Amy Wellings on one side and William Daniels on the other.

Henry Grattan Guinness established the East London Training Institute for Home and Foreign Missions in Stepney Green in 1873, across the road from the Mission Hall of his friend, Thomas Barnardo and moved to larger premises in Harley House in Bow later in that year. The institute was interdenominational and international, opening its own missions in Congo (1878), Peru (1897), India (1899), Borneo (1948), Nepal (1954), and Irian Jaya (1957). Present day Latin Link descends from the Peru mission.

=== Railway ===
In the late 19th century the Brill Tramway had a spur to Kingswood.
1871-04-01 Wotton to Quainton Road opened [Wotton Tramway]
1871-08-19 Wood Siding to Wotton opened [Wotton Tramway]
1871-11- Brill to Wood Siding opened [Wotton Tramway]
1871-11- Wood Siding, Church Siding
1872-01- Wotton, Westcott, Waddesdon Road, Quainton Road (Wotton Tramway)
1872-04- Brill
1891-07-01 Verney Junction to Aylesbury started [Metropolitan]
1892-09-01 Aylesbury to Amersham opened

The Metropolitan extended its route north from Baker Street through Harrow and Rickmansworth to Aylesbury and bought out the Aylesbury & Buckingham Railway from Aylesbury via Quainton Road to Verney Junction - and took over the operation of the Wotton Tramway from Quainton Road to Brill. At the same time Manchester, Sheffield, & Lincolnshire Railway extended its main line south to meet the Metropolitan at Quainton Road and then ran along the latter to Finchley Road, where it diverged west to a separate terminus at Marylebone.

== Tetchwick ==
Within Kingswood parish is the hamlet of Tetchwick, located to the south west of the main village on a spar road off the main A41.
