= Rushbeds Wood =

Nature reserve in Ireland

Coordinates: 51.8341°N 1.0334°W

Rushbeds Wood and Railway Cutting
- Site of Special Scientific Interest
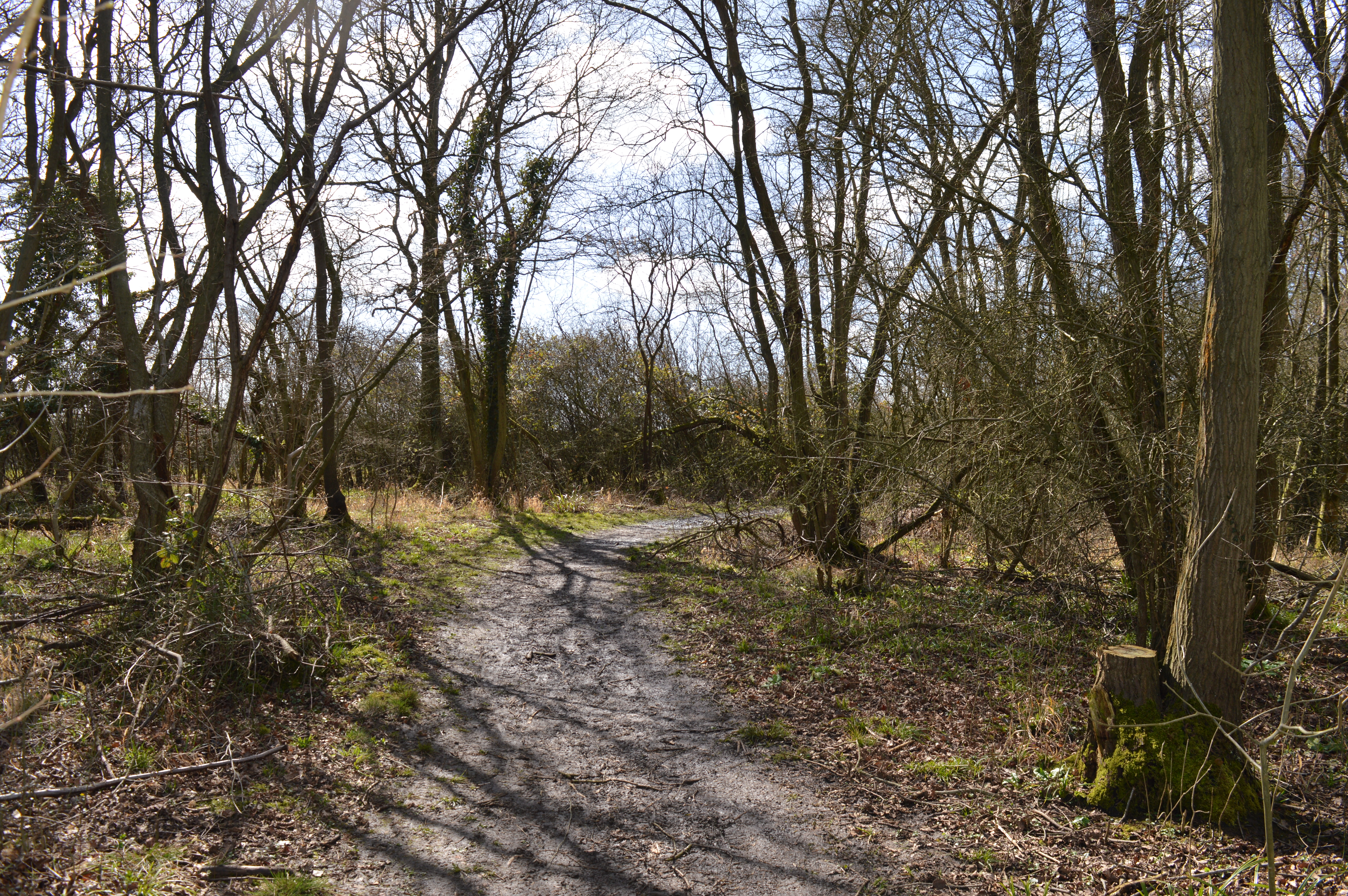
- Location of Rushbeds Wood and Railway Cutting.
- Area of search: Buckinghamshire
- Grid reference: SP667155
- Interest: Biological
- Area: 80.2 ha (198 acres)
- Notification date: 1982
- Location map: Magic Map

Rushbeds Wood is a 56-hectare (140-acre) nature reserve near Wotton Underwood in Buckinghamshire, managed by the Berkshire, Buckinghamshire and Oxfordshire Wildlife Trust (BBOWT). It is a surviving fragment of the ancient Bernwood Forest. The reserve is part of Rushbeds Wood and Railway Cutting, an 80.2-hectare (198-acre) biological Site of Special Scientific Interest. This includes a section of the Chiltern Main Line railway cutting, which runs along the north-east side of the BBOWT reserve.

The site is ancient woodland on heavy clay soils which are often waterlogged. The invertebrate fauna are described by Natural England as "exceptional", including over thirty butterfly species, such as the nationally rare black hairstreak and the scarce wood white and purple emperor. The woodland is wet ash and maple, with other trees including elm and hornbeam. The understorey has species indicative of long tree cover, such as Poa nemoralis and wood millet. There are many common breeding birds and in the ponds and ditches there are breeding smooth and great crested newts. The railway cutting is dominated by upright brome grass.

There is access to the BBOWT site by a railway bridge at the eastern corner of the site.
