= Tethea ampliata =

Scientific classification
- Domain: Eukaryota
- Kingdom: Animalia
- Phylum: Arthropoda
- Class: Insecta
- Order: Lepidoptera
- Family: Drepanidae
- Genus: Tethea
- Species: T. ampliata

Binomial name
- Tethea ampliata (Butler, 1878)

Synonyms
- Cymathophora ampliata Butler, 1878; Palimpsestis daisetsuzana Matsumura, 1927; Cymatophora ampliata angustimedia Warren, 1912; Cymatophora ampliata var. askoldensis Houlbert, 1921

Species of false owlet moth

Tethea ampliata is a moth in the family Drepanidae. It is found in the Russian Far East, Korea, Japan, Taiwan and northern and north-eastern China.

The wingspan is 41–48 mm. Adults are similar to Tethea or, but larger and the forewings are silvery grey. The inner band is darker and straighter with more dentate limiting lines. The outer band has an additional angle towards the costa and the outer line is more regularly undulated, blackish and parallel to the inner line.

== Subspecies ==
- Tethea ampliata ampliata (Russia, Korea, Japan, China: Heilongjiang, Jilin, Liaoning)
- Tethea ampliata grandis Okano, 1959 (Taiwan)
- Tethea ampliata shansiensis Werny, 1966 (China: Henan, Shaanxi, Gansu, Zhejiang, Hubei, Hunan, Jiangxi, Guangxi, Sichuan, Yunnan)
