= Padbury Brook =

Stream in Oxfordshire and Buckinghamshire, England

Coordinates: 52°00′15″N 0°56′36″W

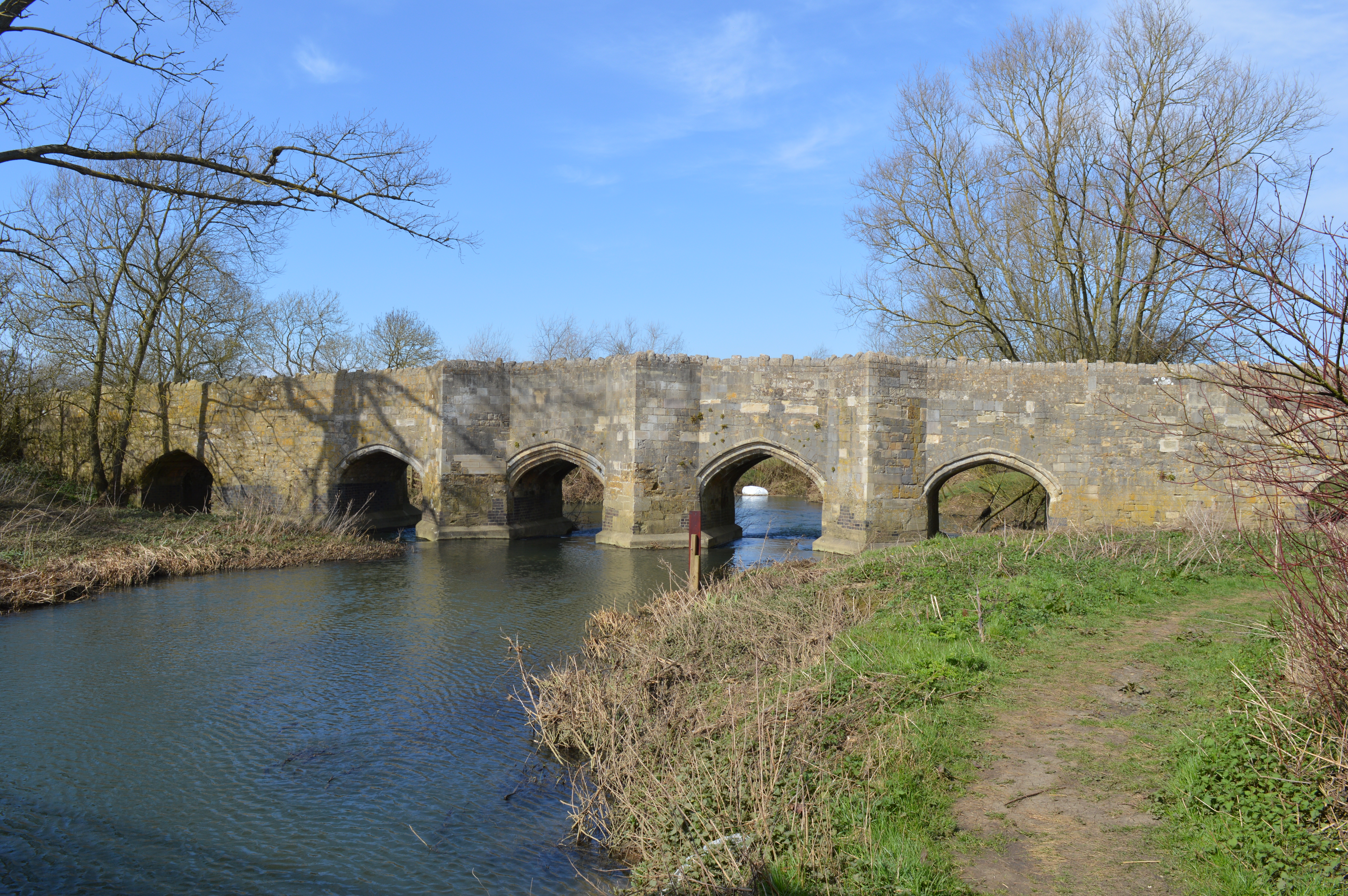
- Fourteenth-century Thornborough Bridge over Padbury Brook

Location
- Country: England
- Counties: Oxfordshire and Buckinghamshire
- Districts / Boroughs: Aylesbury Vale
- Towns: Fringford, Godington, Twyford, Buckinghamshire, Steeple Claydon, Padbury, Thornborough, Buckingham

Physical characteristics
- Source
  - location: just north of Fringford in Oxfordshire
- Mouth: River Great Ouse
- Length: 12 km
- Discharge
  - location: east of Buckingham

Padbury Brook is a stream/river in Oxfordshire and Buckinghamshire; it is a small tributary of the River Great Ouse approximately 12 km in length.

== Course ==
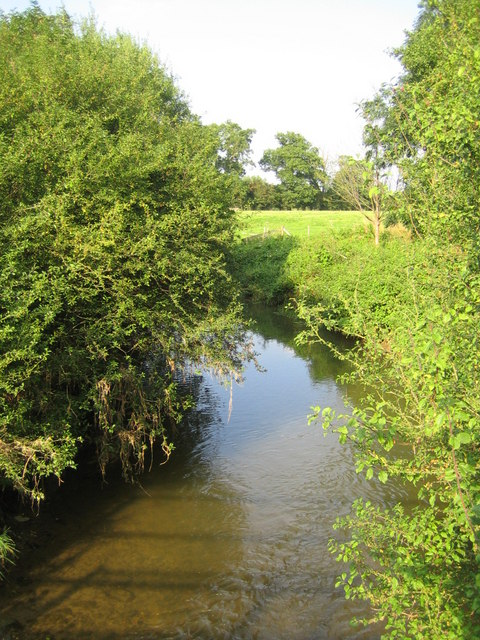
Padbury Brook just downstream from King's Bridge in the direction of the village of Padbury to the north. About 300m ahead, the brook is joined by Claydon Brook, and after that is known locally as The Twins

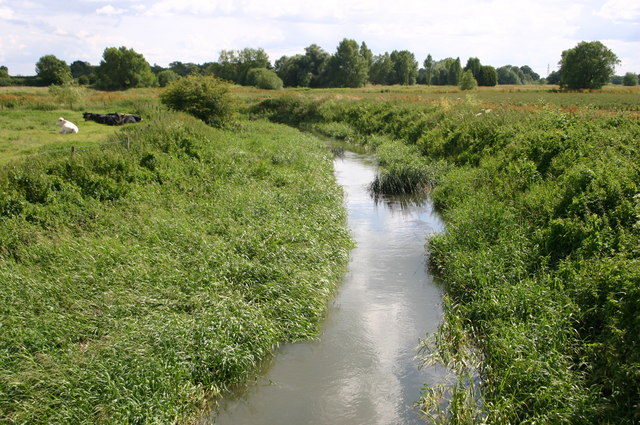
Padbury Brook at Oxlane Bridge

Padbury brook rises from its source just north of Fringford in Oxfordshire. The brook heads eastward under the A4421 south of Newton Morrell in Oxfordshire, onwards north of Godington, then on into Buckinghamshire. The brook heads eastward, north of Twyford, Buckinghamshire, continuing north of Steeple Claydon, where it was known locally as The planks, to Oxlade bridge near Padbury. Padbury Brook then flows north-east in a wide and shallow valley passing north-east of Padbury, the brook goes under the A413 road, then under the A421 road (Buckingham to Milton Keynes road), then under Thornborough Bridge and on to King's Bridge, where it is then joined by its other arm, from the west (Thornborough) and becomes 'The Twins', before joining the River Great Ouse, east of Buckingham and west of Thornborough.

== Wildlife ==
Padbury Brook is home to fish such as the stone loach (Barbatula tarantula), spined loach ( Cobitis taenia), the common minnow (Phoxinus phoxinus), the common roach (Rutilus rutilus), the european bullhead (Cottus gobio), and the three-spined stickleback (Gasterosteus aculeatus). Larger fish including european chub (Squalius cephalus), European perch (perca fluviatilis) and European eel (Anguilla anguilla) are also resident in the river. There are also signal crayfish (Pacifastacus leniusculus) in the river with most of the crayfish being small in size with a small number of larger ones. There also be a range of other wildlife such as swans, ducks, voles and myriad types of water insects.

== HS2 ==
Padbury Brook will be affected by the construction of HS2 and is currently (2021) in the process of having new diversions and new bridges constructed to facilitate the works with minimal impact to the natural environment. Padbury Brook has been subject to industrial activity over its modern history.

== Gallery ==
Padbury stream Gallery

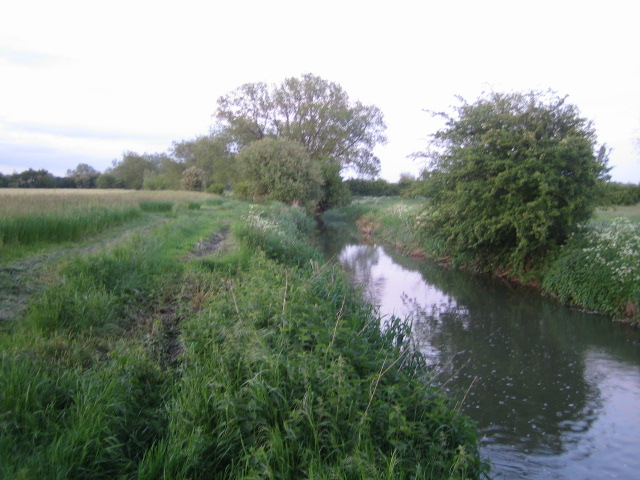
Padbury Brook near Three Bridge Mill, Twyford

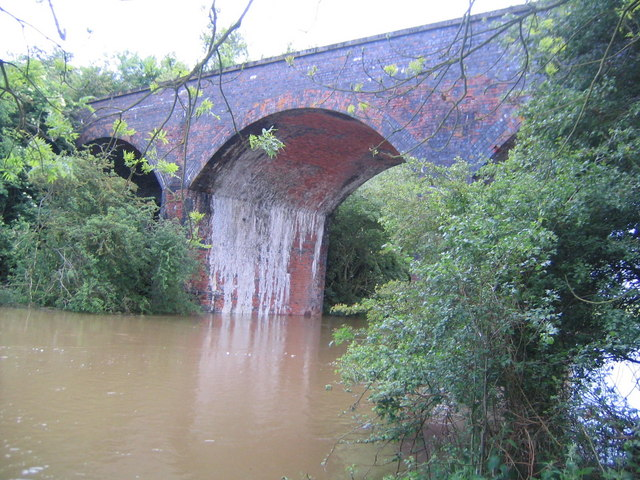
Padbury Viaduct over the Padbury Brook

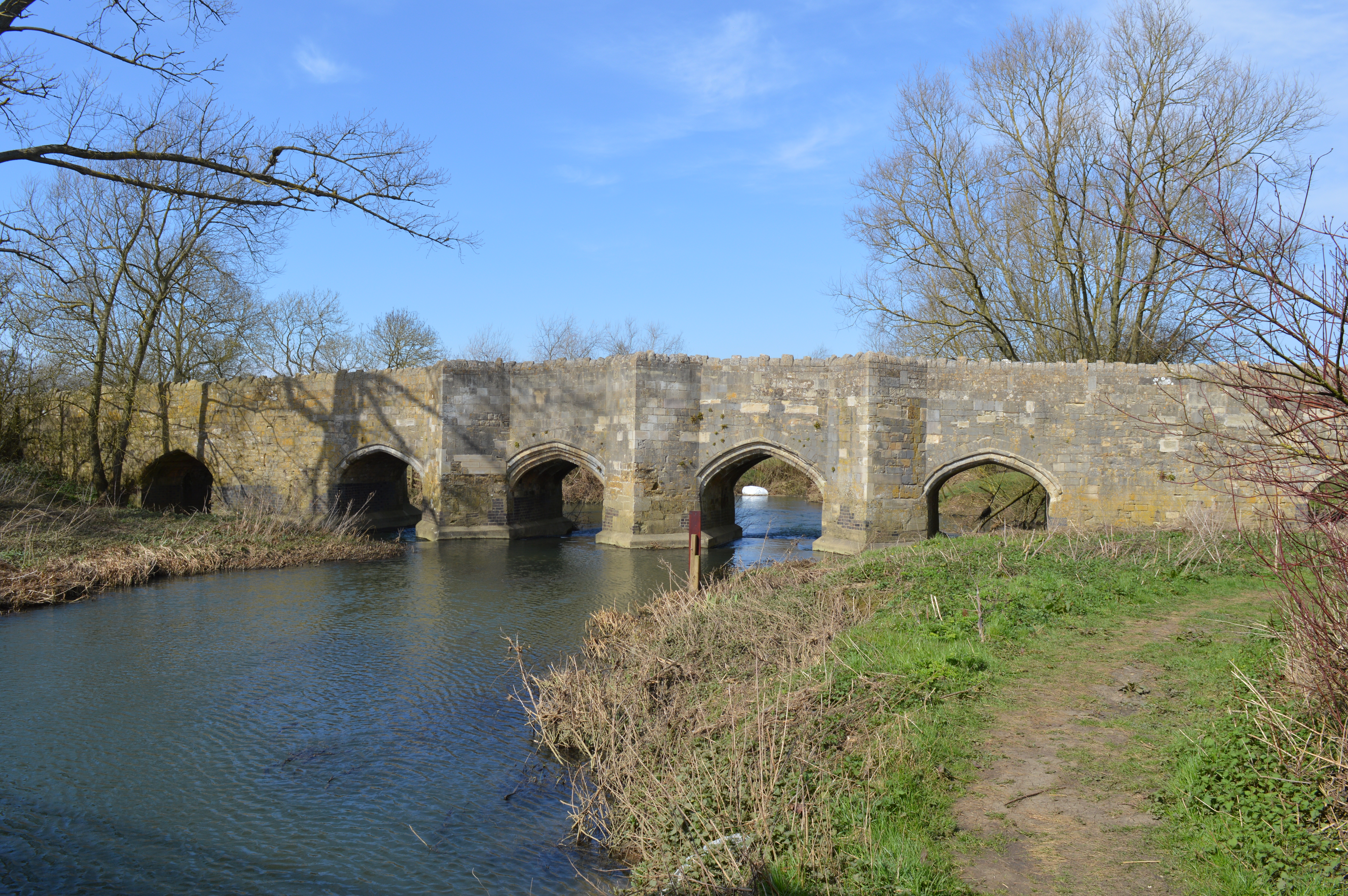
Fourteenth-century Thornborough Bridge, the only surviving medieval bridge in Buckinghamshire

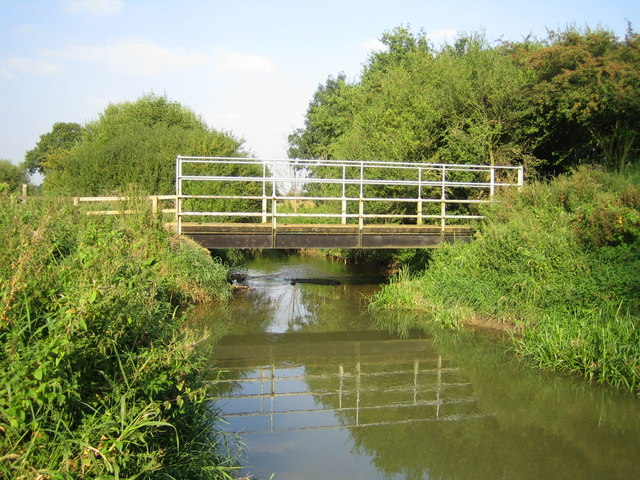
King's Bridge over Padbury Brook, about 300m west of the hamlet of Kingsbridge
