= Stanton Great Wood =

Site of Special Scientific Interest in Oxfordshire, England

Coordinates: 51.778°N 1.149°W

- Site of Special Scientific Interest
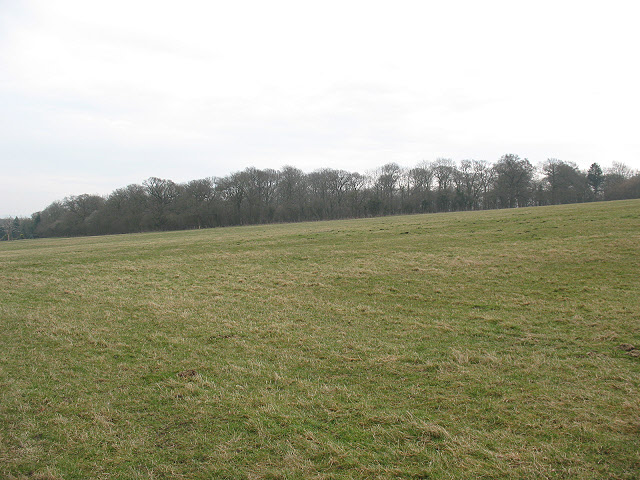
- Location of Stanton Great Wood.
- Area of search: Oxfordshire
- Grid reference: SP 588 092
- Interest: Biological
- Area: 58.2 hectares (144 acres)
- Notification date: 1987
- Location map: Magic Map

Stanton Great Wood is a 58.2-hectare (144-acre) biological Site of Special Scientific Interest north-east of Oxford in Oxfordshire.

This coppice with standards wood is traditionally managed. The dominant trees are pedunculate oak, ash and hazel, and there is a rich flora and diverse insects. Moths include the buff footman, poplar lutestring, blotched emerald, maiden's blush and the nationally uncommon small black arches.

The site is private land with no public access.
