= Tethea albicosta =

Scientific classification
- Kingdom: Animalia
- Phylum: Arthropoda
- Clade: Pancrustacea
- Class: Insecta
- Order: Lepidoptera
- Family: Drepanidae
- Genus: Tethea
- Species: T. albicosta

Binomial name
- Tethea albicosta (Moore, 1867)

Synonyms
- Thyatira albicosta Moore, 1867; Tethea albicosta birmanica Werny, 1966

Species of false owlet moth

Tethea albicosta is a moth in the family Drepanidae. It is found in Nepal, Myanmar, the Indian province of Assam, and the Chinese provinces of Hubei, Hunan, Sichuan, Guangdong, Guangxi, Yunnan and Tibet.

Adults are greyish brown, the forewings varied pinkish and greenish white along the costa beneath which are several narrow transverse undulating dark-brown pale-bordered lines. There are two indistinct reniform discal marks, as well as a curved streak beneath the apex and a marginal undulating narrow line. The hindwings have a discal and two subbasal pale bands.
