= Holton Wood =

Woodland in Holton, Oxfordshire, England

Coordinates: 51.767°N 1.133°W

- Site of Special Scientific Interest
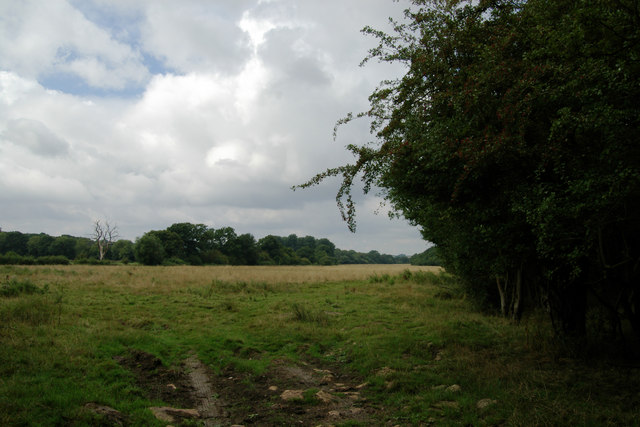
- Location of Holton Wood.
- Area of search: Oxfordshire
- Grid reference: SP 599 079
- Interest: Biological
- Area: 50.6 hectares (125 acres)
- Notification date: 1984
- Location map: Magic Map

Holton Wood is a 50.6-hectare (125-acre) biological Site of Special Scientific Interest east of Oxford in Oxfordshire.

This ancient wood was formerly part of Bernwood Forest, which was a medieval hunting forest. It is semi-natural coppice with standards, with fine oak standards of varying ages. It has a rich invertebrate fauna, including 27 species of butterfly, with uncommon species such as white admiral and purple emperor.
