= Thornborough Bridge =

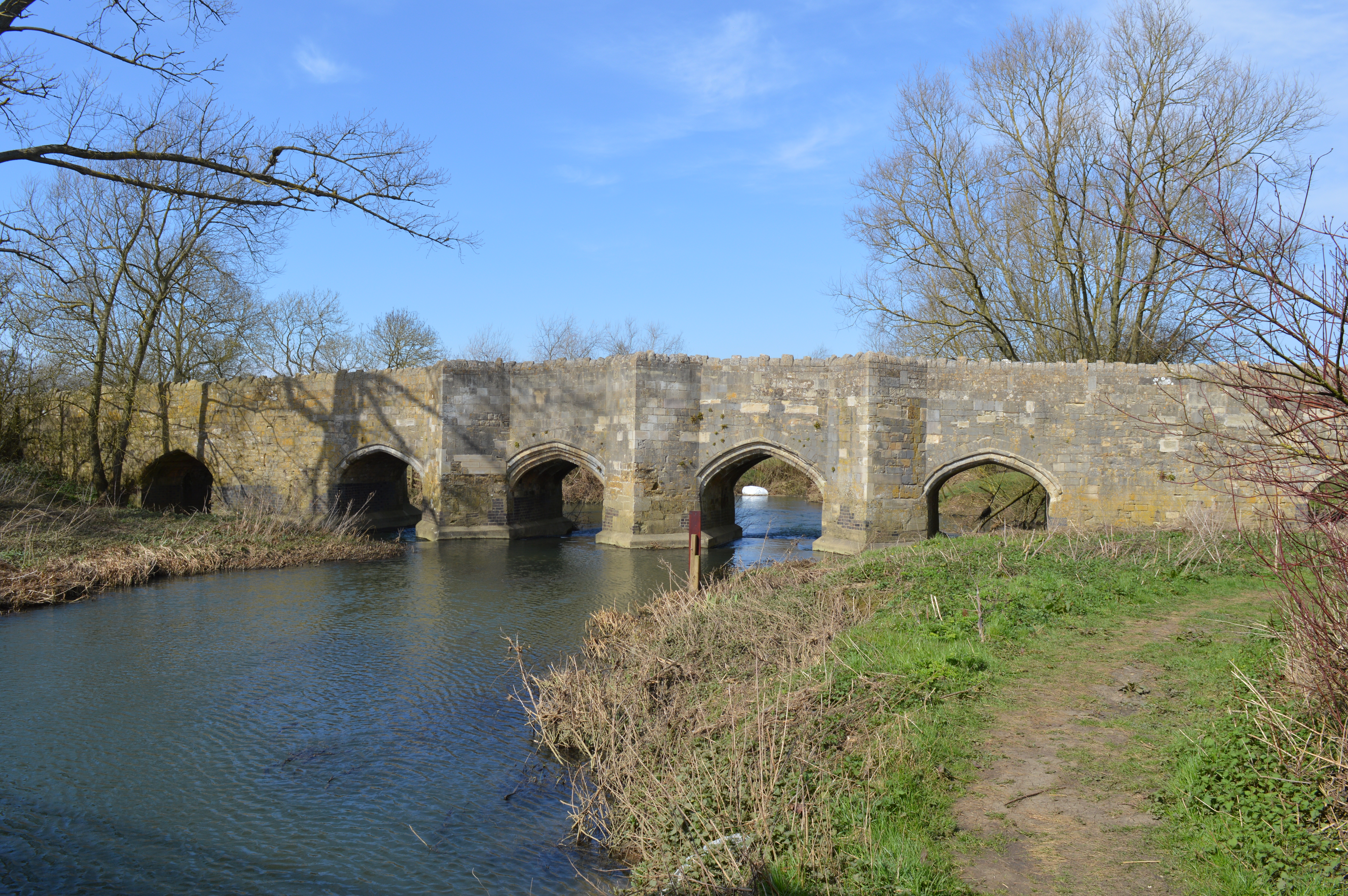
- View from the south
- Coordinates: 51°59′33″N 0°56′22″W
- Carries: Pedestrians (from 1974); A421 road (pre-1974)
- Crosses: Padbury Brook, tributary of River Great Ouse
- Locale: Buckingham/Thornborough parish border, Buckinghamshire
- Heritage status: Grade I listed structure

Characteristics
- Material: Stone
- Total length: 30m (approx)
- Width: 4m (approx)
- No. of spans: 6
- Piers in water: 3

History
- Opened: 14th century

Location
- Interactive map of Thornborough Bridge

Thornborough Bridge is situated on the original Bletchley to Buckingham road, now bypassed by a modern bridge in 1974 for the A421. The bridge is accessible to pedestrians from an adjacent lay-by.

The bridge straddles the parish boundaries of Thornborough and Buckingham, where the parish boundary follows the line of Padbury Brook (also known as The Twins), a tributary of the River Great Ouse. Dating back to the end of the 14th century, it is the only surviving mediaeval bridge in Buckinghamshire. The parish division is marked by a boundary stone in the middle of the bridge.

The stone bridge measures approximately 30 m (98 ft) long and 4 m (13 ft) wide, spanning the river with six low arches. Three refuges are formed within the parapet on the south side.

The bridge is Grade I listed by English Heritage.
