= Tethea punctorenalia =

Scientific classification
- Domain: Eukaryota
- Kingdom: Animalia
- Phylum: Arthropoda
- Class: Insecta
- Order: Lepidoptera
- Family: Drepanidae
- Genus: Tethea
- Species: T. punctorenalia

Binomial name
- Tethea punctorenalia Houlbert, 1921

Species of false owlet moth

Tethea punctorenalia is a moth in the family Drepanidae. It is found in the Chinese provinces of Shaanxi and Sichuan.
