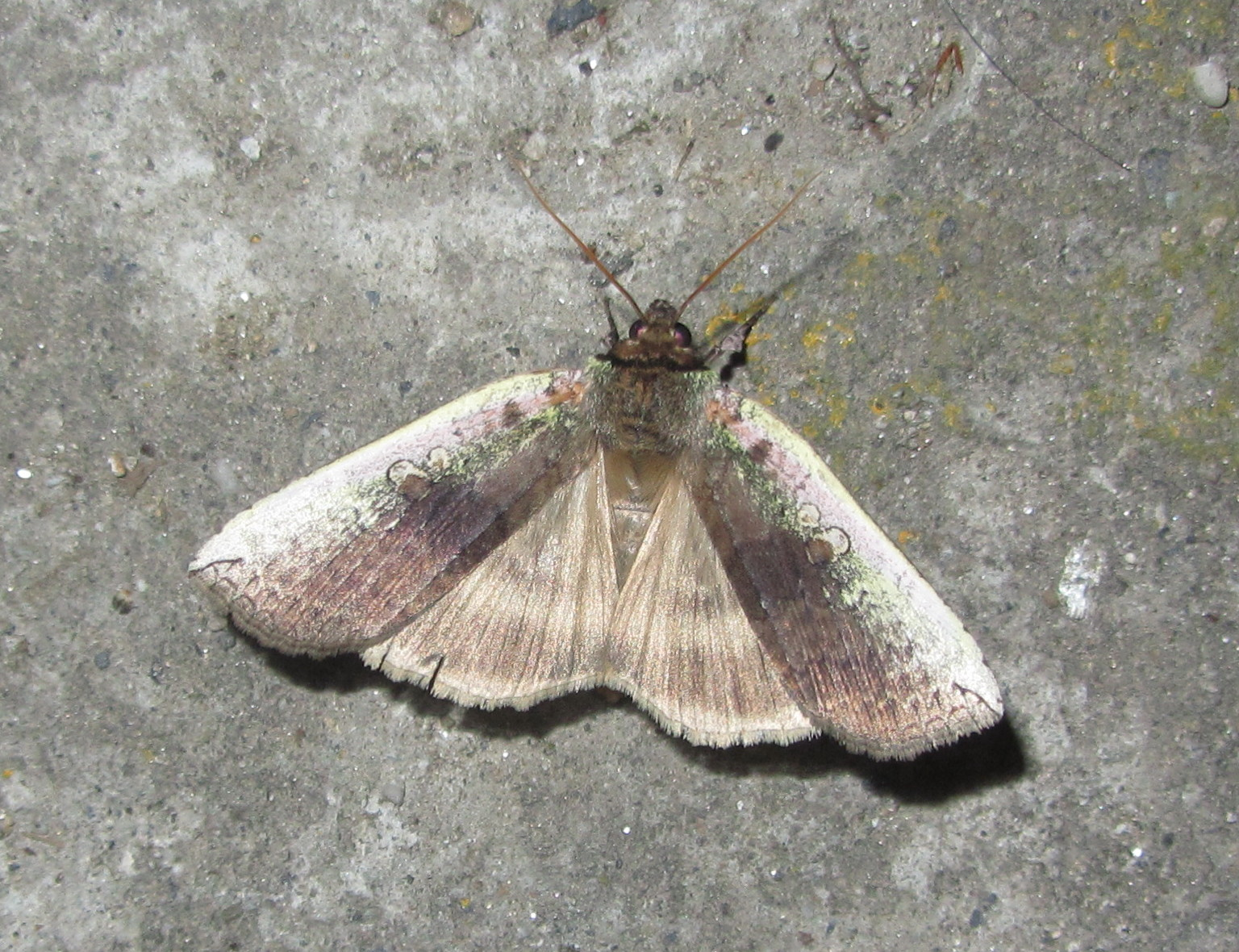

Scientific classification
- Domain: Eukaryota
- Kingdom: Animalia
- Phylum: Arthropoda
- Class: Insecta
- Order: Lepidoptera
- Family: Drepanidae
- Genus: Tethea
- Species: T. oberthueri

Binomial name
- Tethea oberthueri (Houlbert, 1921)

Synonyms
- Saronaga oberthueri Houlbert, 1921; Tethea oberthuri; Tethea oberthueri occidentalis Werny, 1966; Tethea oberthueri chekiangensis Werny, 1966; Tethea oberthueri fukienensis Werny, 1966; Saronaga taiwana Matsumura, 1931; Tethea oberthüri wilemani Werny, 1966

= Tethea oberthueri =

Species of false owlet moth

Tethea oberthueri is a moth in the family Drepanidae. It is found in Burma, Nepal, Malaysia, India, China, Taiwan and also on Borneo.

== Subspecies ==
- Tethea oberthueri oberthueri (India, Burma, Nepal, Malaysia, China: Shaanxi, Zhejiang, Hubei, Hunan, Fujian, Hainan, Guangxi, Sichuan, Yunnan, Tibet)
- Tethea oberthueri baluensis Werny, 1966 (Borneo)
- Tethea oberthueri taiwana (Matsumura, 1931) (Taiwan)
