= Tethea fusca =

Scientific classification
- Domain: Eukaryota
- Kingdom: Animalia
- Phylum: Arthropoda
- Class: Insecta
- Order: Lepidoptera
- Family: Drepanidae
- Genus: Tethea
- Species: T. fusca

Binomial name
- Tethea fusca Werny, 1966

Species of false owlet moth

Tethea fusca is a moth in the family Drepanidae first described by Werny in 1966. It is found in the Chinese provinces of Sichuan and Yunnan.
