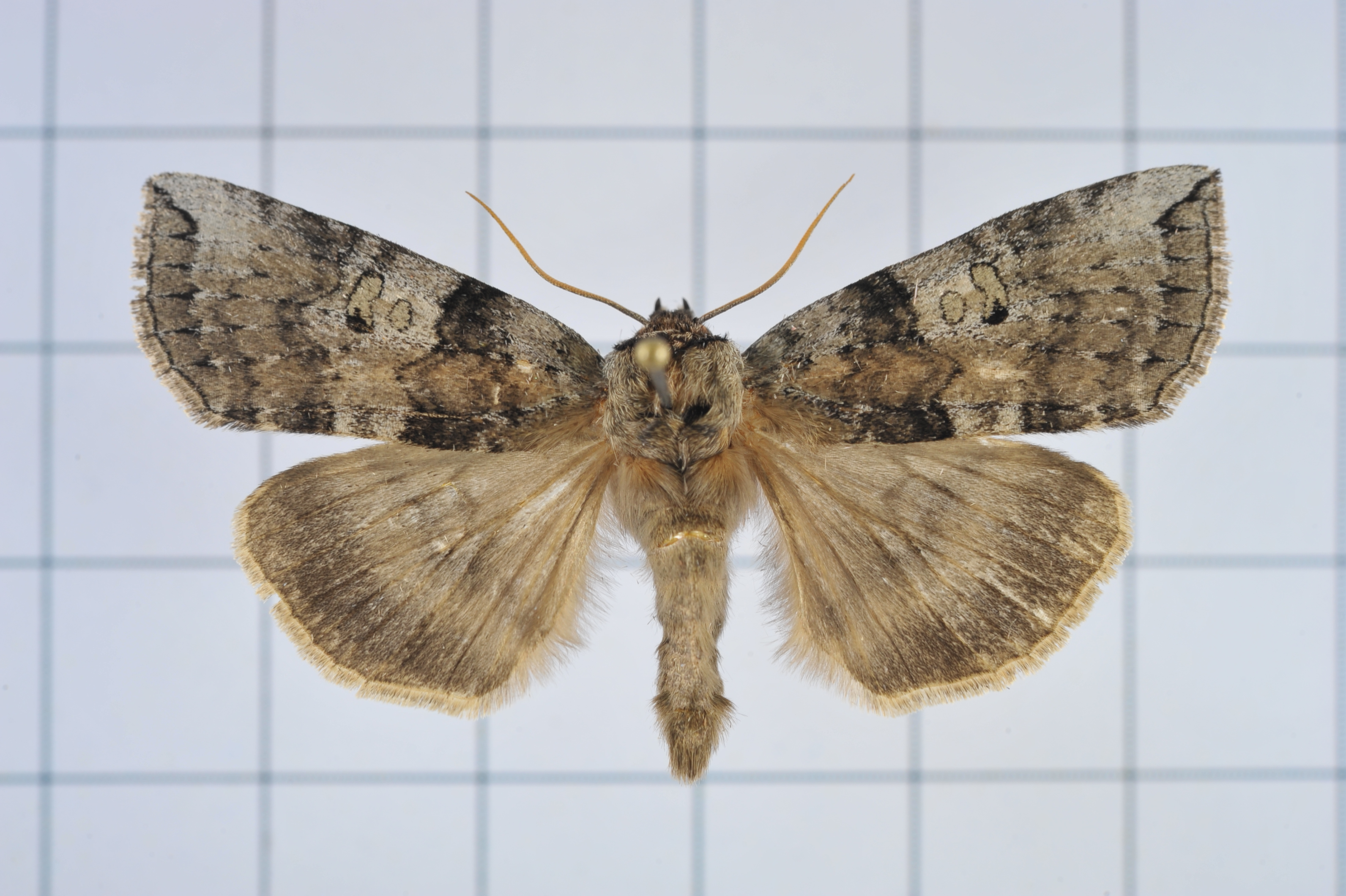

Scientific classification
- Domain: Eukaryota
- Kingdom: Animalia
- Phylum: Arthropoda
- Class: Insecta
- Order: Lepidoptera
- Family: Drepanidae
- Genus: Tethea
- Species: T. octogesima

Binomial name
- Tethea octogesima (Butler, 1878)

Synonyms
- Cymatophora octogesima Butler, 1878; Cymatophora intensa Butler, 1881; Cymatophora angustata Staudinger, 1885; Saronaga watanabei Matsumura, 1931; Tethea intensa griseomacula Werny, 1966

= Tethea octogesima =

Species of false owlet moth

Tethea octogesima is a moth in the family Drepanidae first described by Arthur Gardiner Butler in 1878. It is found in Japan, Korea, China (Jilin, Shaanxi, Zhejiang), Taiwan and the Russian Far East.

The wingspan is 20–24 mm. Adults have a dark silvery grey tint, with deep black the transverse lines and markings of the reniform and orbicular spots. The lines near the base are more dentated, the central band is wider and its external limiting line irregularly zigzag.

== Subspecies ==
- Tethea octogesima octogesima (Japan, Korea, Russian Far East, China: Jilin, Shaanxi, Zhejiang)
- Tethea octogesima watanabei (Matsumura, 1931) (Taiwan)
