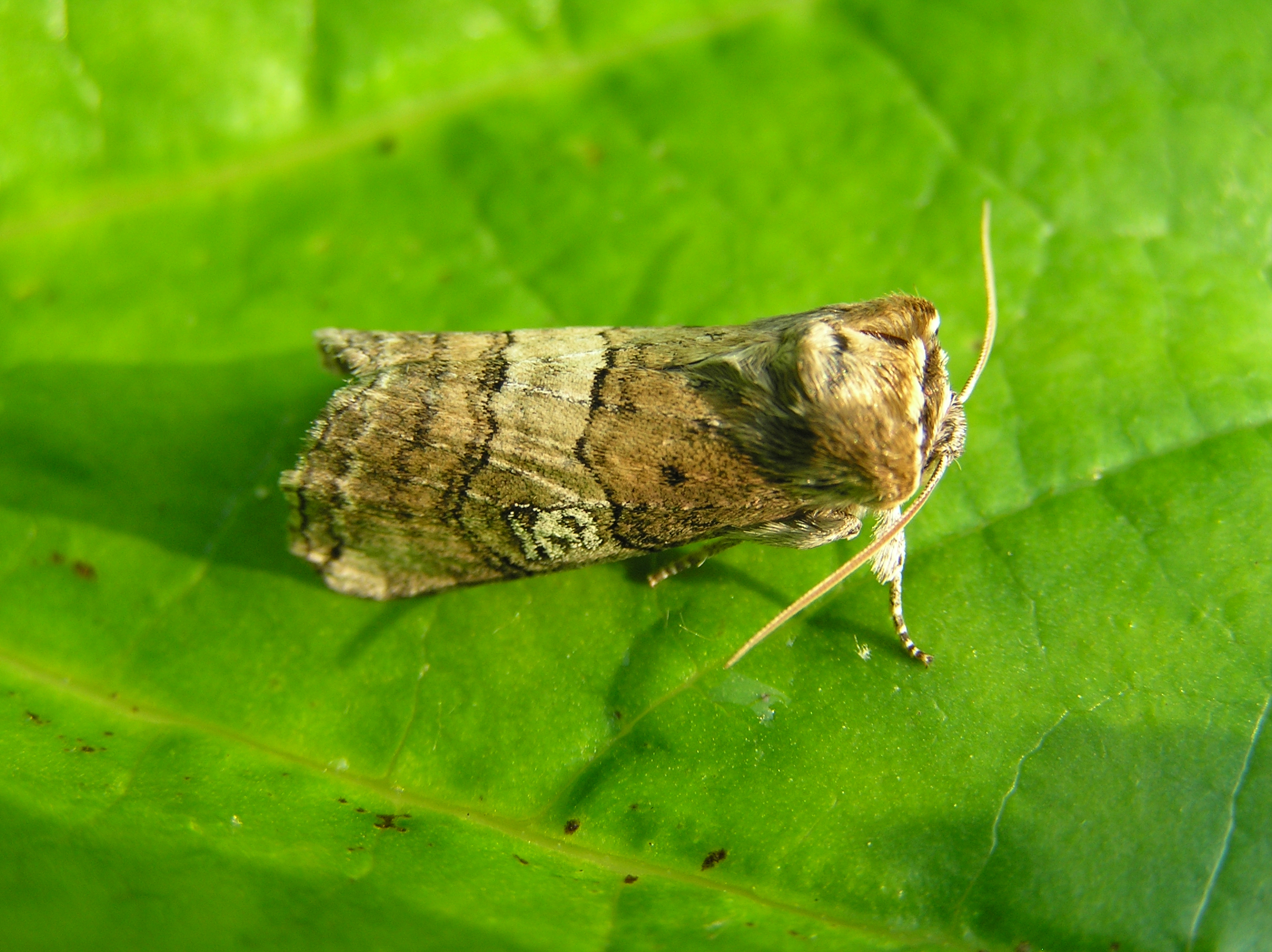
- Tethea ocularis

Scientific classification
- Kingdom: Animalia
- Phylum: Arthropoda
- Clade: Pancrustacea
- Class: Insecta
- Order: Lepidoptera
- Family: Drepanidae
- Genus: Tethea; Ochsenheimer, 1816

Synonyms
- Palimpsestis Hübner, [1821]; Bombycia Hübner, 1822; Ceropacha Stephens, 1829; Ceratopacha Stephens, 1850; Saronaga Moore, 1881; Eutethea Grote, 1902; Eutethia Grote, 1902; Episaronaga Matsumura, 1933

= Tethea =

Moth genus in family Drepanidae

Tethea is a genus of moths belonging to the family Drepanidae and subfamily Thyatirinae. It was first described by Ferdinand Ochsenheimer in 1816.

== Species ==
- Subgenus Saronaga Moore, 1881
  - Tethea albicosta (Moore, 1867)
  - Tethea consimilis (Warren, 1912)
    - Tethea consimilis aurisigna (Bryk, 1943)
    - Tethea consimilis c-album (Matsumura, 1931)
    - Tethea consimilis commifera (Warren, 1912)
    - Tethea consimilis congener (Roepke, 1945)
  - Tethea oberthueri (Houlbert, 1921)
- Subgenus Tethea
  - Tethea albicostata (Bremer, 1861)
  - Tethea ampliata (Butler, 1878)
    - Tethea ampliata grandis Okano, 1959
    - Tethea ampliata shansiensis Werny, 1966
  - Tethea fusca Werny, 1966
  - Tethea longisigna Laszlo, G.Ronkay, L.Ronkay & Witt, 2007
  - Tethea octogesima (Butler, 1878)
    - Tethea octogesima watanabei (Matsumura, 1931)
  - Tethea ocularis (Linnaeus, 1767)
  - Tethea or (Denis & Schiffermüller, 1775)
  - Tethea punctorenalia Houlbert, 1921
  - Tethea subampliata (Houlbert, 1921)
  - Tethea trifolium (Alpheraky, 1895)
