= Holly Wood, Oxfordshire =

Protected area in Oxfordshire, England

Coordinates: 51.786°N 1.150°W

Holly Wood
- Site of Special Scientific Interest
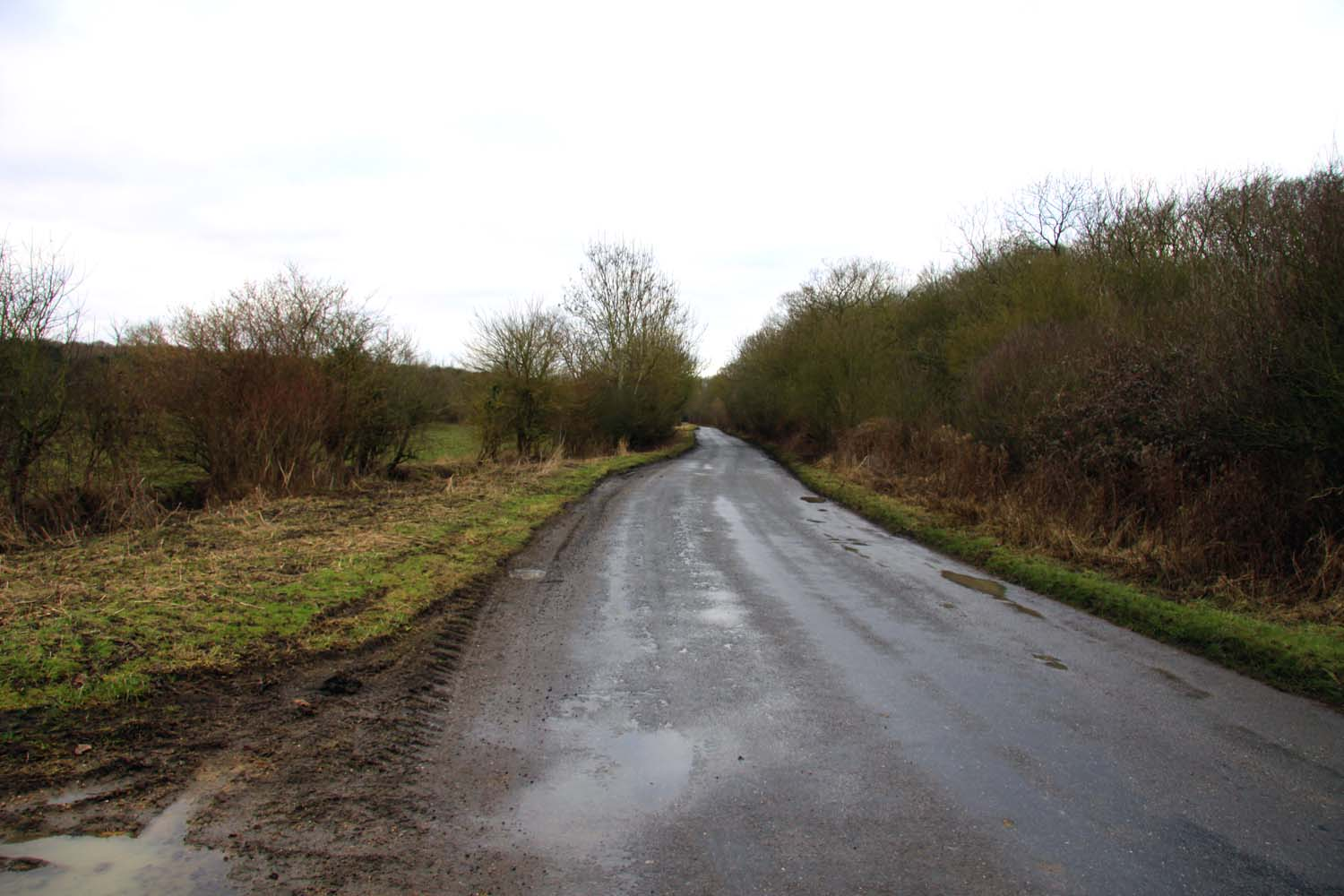
- Location of Holly Wood.
- Area of search: Oxfordshire
- Grid reference: SP 587 100
- Interest: Biological
- Area: 25.6 hectares (63 acres)
- Notification date: 1986
- Location map: Magic Map

Holly Wood is a 25.6-hectare (63-acre) biological Site of Special Scientific Interest north-east of Oxford in Oxfordshire.

This ancient wood is a small remnant of the medieval Royal Forest of Shotover. It is coppice with standards on Oxford Clay with a varied invertebrate fauna. There are several uncommon butterflies such as the black hairstreak and purple emperor.
