= Shabbington Woods Complex =

Woodlands in Buckinghamshire, England

Coordinates: 51.795°N 1.109°W

- Site of Special Scientific Interest
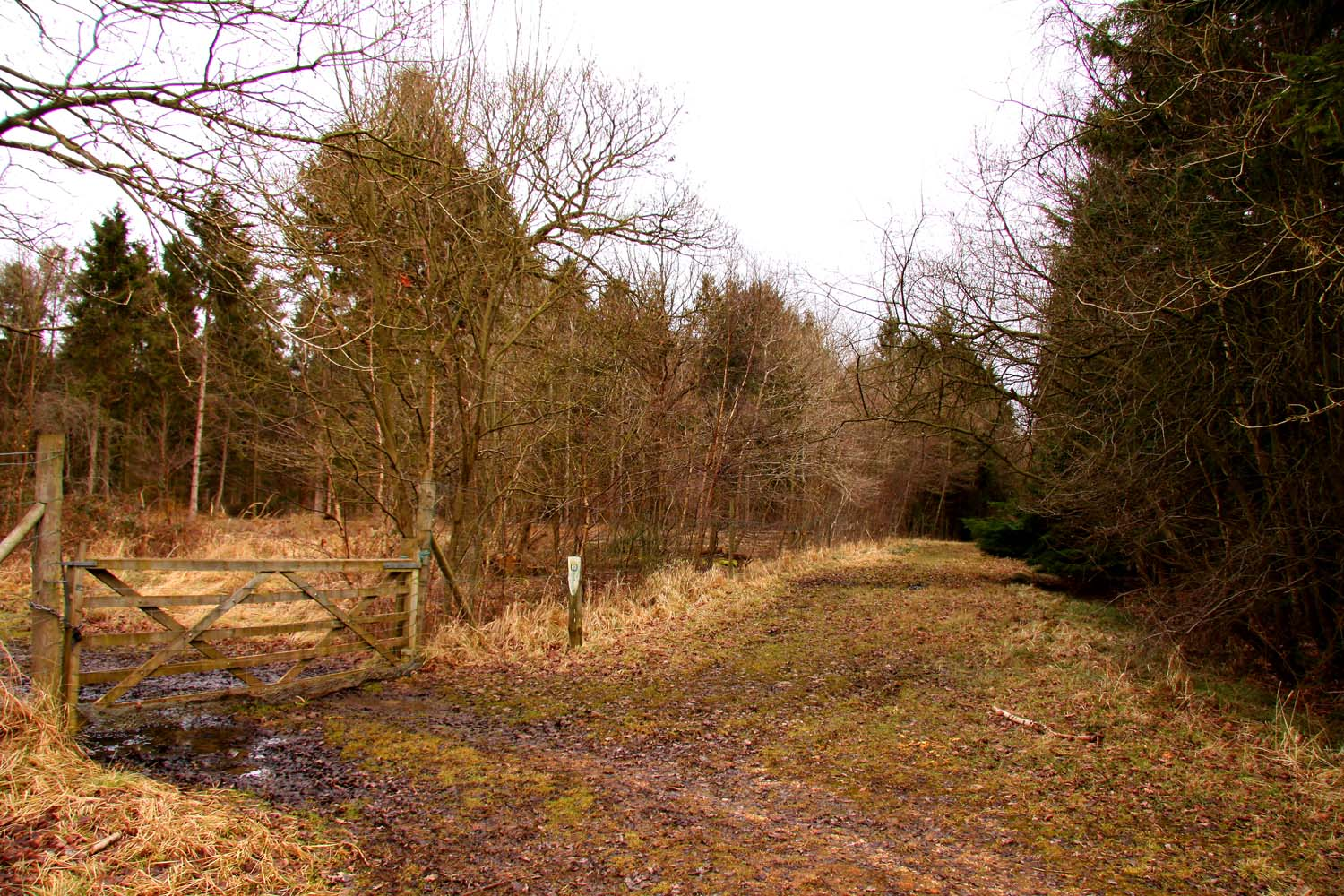
- Location of Shabbington Woods Complex.
- Area of search: Buckinghamshire
- Grid reference: SP615110
- Interest: Biological
- Area: 305.6 ha (755 acres)
- Notification date: 1987
- Location map: Magic Map

Shabbington Woods Complex is a 305.6-hectare (755-acre) biological Site of Special Scientific Interest (SSSI) between Horton-cum-Studley and Worminghall in Buckinghamshire. It comprises Shabbington Wood, Bernwood Forest, Hell Coppice, Oakley Wood and York's Wood. Shabbington Wood is owned by the Forestry Commission, and a small area of 7.5 hectares called Bernwood Meadows is managed by the Berkshire, Buckinghamshire and Oxfordshire Wildlife Trust.

The site is the largest remnant of the former Royal Forest of Bernwood. Other remnants are SSSIs in Oxfordshire. In this site only a small area of ancient woodland survives, and the main interest is the rich insect fauna. There are also two unimproved meadows, bounded by mature hedges, and several ponds. Over forty species of butterfly have been recorded, including the rare Duke of Burgundy.
