= Tethea albicostata =

Scientific classification
- Domain: Eukaryota
- Kingdom: Animalia
- Phylum: Arthropoda
- Class: Insecta
- Order: Lepidoptera
- Family: Drepanidae
- Genus: Tethea
- Species: T. albicostata

Binomial name
- Tethea albicostata (Bremer, 1861)

Synonyms
- Cymatophora albicostata Bremer, 1861; Saronaga albicostata koreonaga Bryk, 1948; Tethea albicostata montana Werny, 1966; Tethea albicostata japonibia Werny, 1966; Tethea albicostata contrastata Werny, 1966

Species of false owlet moth

Tethea albicostata is a moth in the family Drepanidae. It is found in western, north-eastern, northern and central China (Heilongjiang, Jilin, Hebei, Beijing, Shaanxi, Gansu, Jiangsu, Zhejiang, Hubei, Hunan), Korea, the Russian Far East and Japan. The habitat consists of mixed broad-leaved-coniferous forests and oak woods.
