= Tethea trifolium =

Scientific classification
- Kingdom: Animalia
- Phylum: Arthropoda
- Class: Insecta
- Order: Lepidoptera
- Family: Drepanidae
- Genus: Tethea
- Species: T. trifolium

Binomial name
- Tethea trifolium (Alphéraky, 1895)

Synonyms
- Cymatophora trifolium Alphéraky, 1895; Saronaga japonica Okano, 1959

Species of false owlet moth

Tethea trifolium is a moth in the family Drepanidae. It is found in China (Heilongjiang, Jilin), the Russian Far East and Japan (Hokkaido, Honshu). The habitat consists of various types of mixed and broad-leaved forests.

The larvae feed on Malus mandshurica and Prunus avium.
