= Ham Home-cum-Hamgreen Woods =

Protected area in Buckinghamshire, England

Coordinates: 51.8653°N 0.9921°W

- Site of Special Scientific Interest
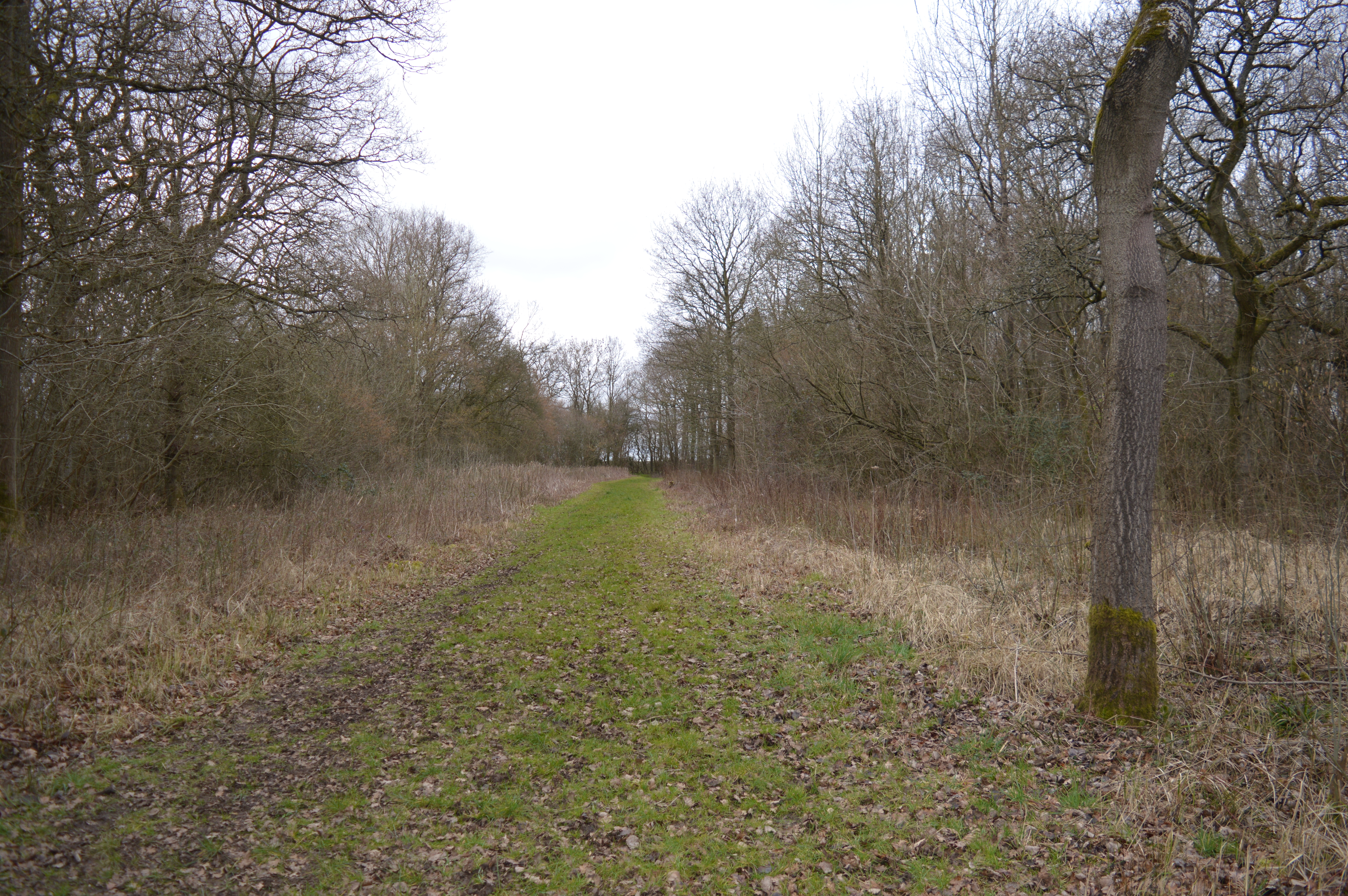
- Path in Ham Home Wood
- Location of Ham Home-cum-Hamgreen Woods.
- Area of search: Buckinghamshire
- Grid reference: SP695190
- Interest: Biological
- Area: 23.2 ha (57 acres)
- Notification date: 1984
- Location map: Magic Map

Ham Home-cum-Hamgreen Woods is a 23.2-hectare (57-acre) biological Site of Special Scientific Interest in Kingswood near Grendon Underwood in Buckinghamshire. It is composed of two separate areas, Ham Home Wood and Hamgreen Wood, and is a small part of the formerly extensive Bernwood Forest.

The site is woodland on clay, and although most of it has been coppiced at different times, it has a varied structure, and rich variety of flora and invertebrates. These factors, together with the presence of wild service trees, show that the woods are ancient. The main tree is oak, with an understorey which includes wych elm, crab apple and guelder rose. Flowers include primroses and bluebells, and in wetter areas there are ragged robin and marsh bedstraw. The woods have the largest British breeding colony of the nationally rare black hairstreak butterfly.

There is access from the A41 road and Grendon Road
