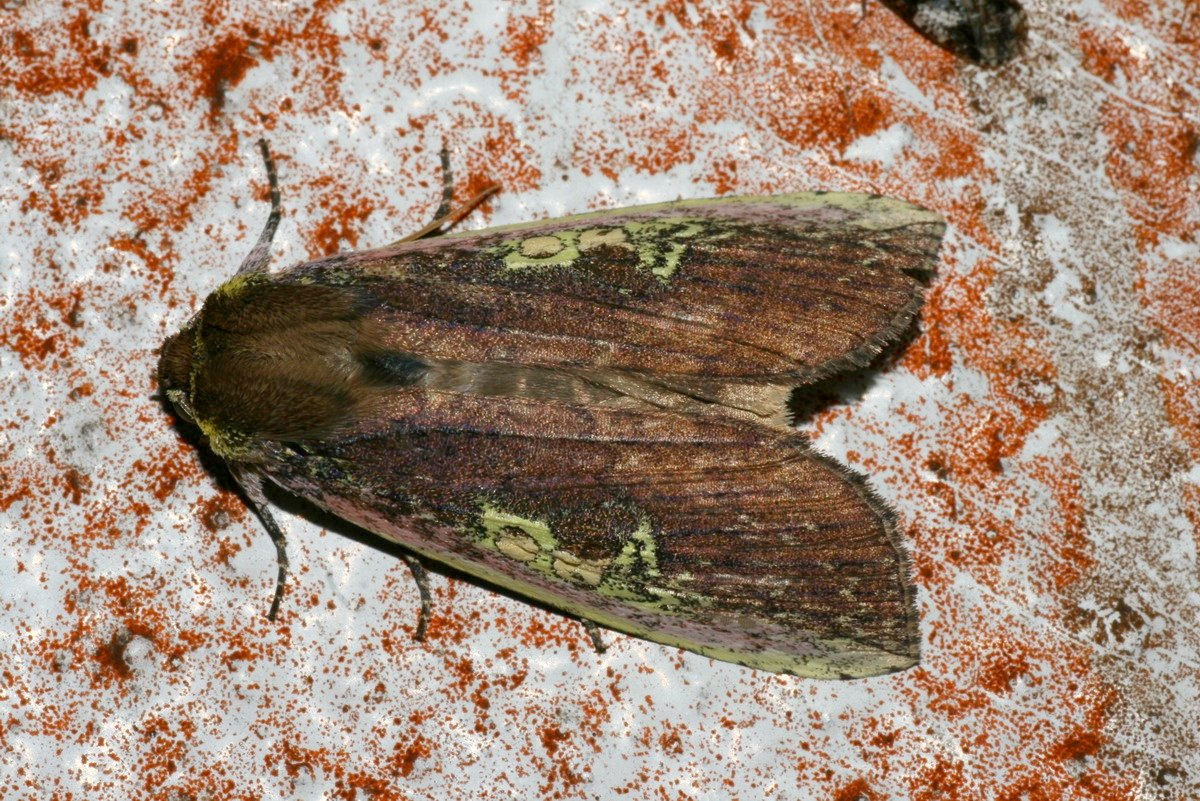

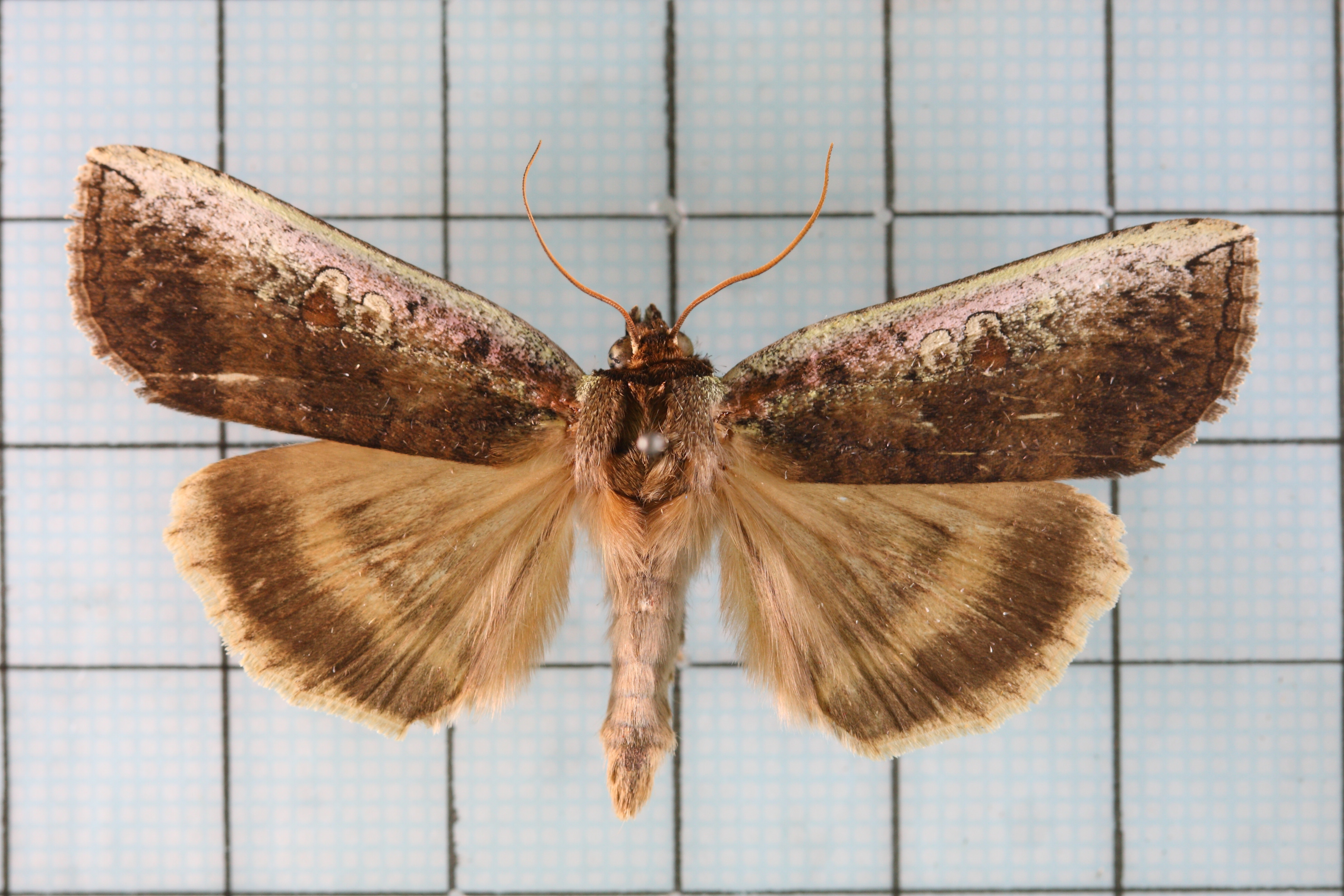

Scientific classification
- Kingdom: Animalia
- Phylum: Arthropoda
- Clade: Pancrustacea
- Class: Insecta
- Order: Lepidoptera
- Family: Drepanidae
- Genus: Tethea
- Species: T. consimilis

Binomial name
- Tethea consimilis (Warren, 1912)

Synonyms
- Saronaga consimilis Warren, 1912; Tethea consimilis birohoensis Werny, 1966; Tethea consimilis hoenei Werny, 1966; Tethea consimilis flavescens Werny, 1966; Saronaga commifera aurisigna Bryk, 1943; Saronaga c-album Matsumura, 1931; Saronaga commifera Warren, 1912; Tethea consimilis szechwanensis Werny, 1966; Saronaga congener Roepke, 1945; Tethea consimilis diehli Werny, 1966

= Tethea consimilis =

Species of false owlet moth

Tethea consimilis is a species of moth in the family Drepanidae first described by Warren in 1912. It is found in Asia, including the Russian Far East, Japan, Korea, Taiwan, Myanmar, Indonesia and India. The habitat consists of various types of mixed and broad-leaved forests.

The wingspan is 50–58 mm.

The larvae feed on Sorbus species and Prunus avium.

== Subspecies ==
- Tethea consimilis consimilis (south-eastern Russia, Japan, Korean Peninsula, China: Jilin, Henan, Shaanxi, Gansu, Zhejiang, Hubei, Hunan, Fujian, Guangdong, Guangxi)
- Tethea consimilis aurisigna (Bryk, 1943) (Myanmar, Vietnam, Thailand, Malaysia, China: Hainan)
- Tethea consimilis c-album (Matsumura, 1931) (Taiwan)
- Tethea consimilis commifera (Warren, 1912) (India, Nepal, China: Sichuan, Yunnan, Tibet)
- Tethea consimilis congener (Roepke, 1945) (Sumatra)
