= Tethea longisigna =

Scientific classification
- Kingdom: Animalia
- Phylum: Arthropoda
- Clade: Pancrustacea
- Class: Insecta
- Order: Lepidoptera
- Family: Drepanidae
- Genus: Tethea
- Species: T. longisigna

Binomial name
- Tethea longisigna László, G. Ronkay, L. Ronkay & Witt, 2007

Species of false owlet moth

Tethea longisigna is a moth in the family Drepanidae first described by Gyula M. László, Gábor Ronkay, László Aladár Ronkay and Thomas Joseph Witt in 2007. It is found in the Chinese provinces of Heilongjiang, Shaanxi, Gansu, Xinjiang, Hubei, Zhejiang, Fujian, Sichuan and Yunnan.
