= Claydon Brook =

River in Buckinghamshire, England

Coordinates: 51.947231°N 0.933686°W

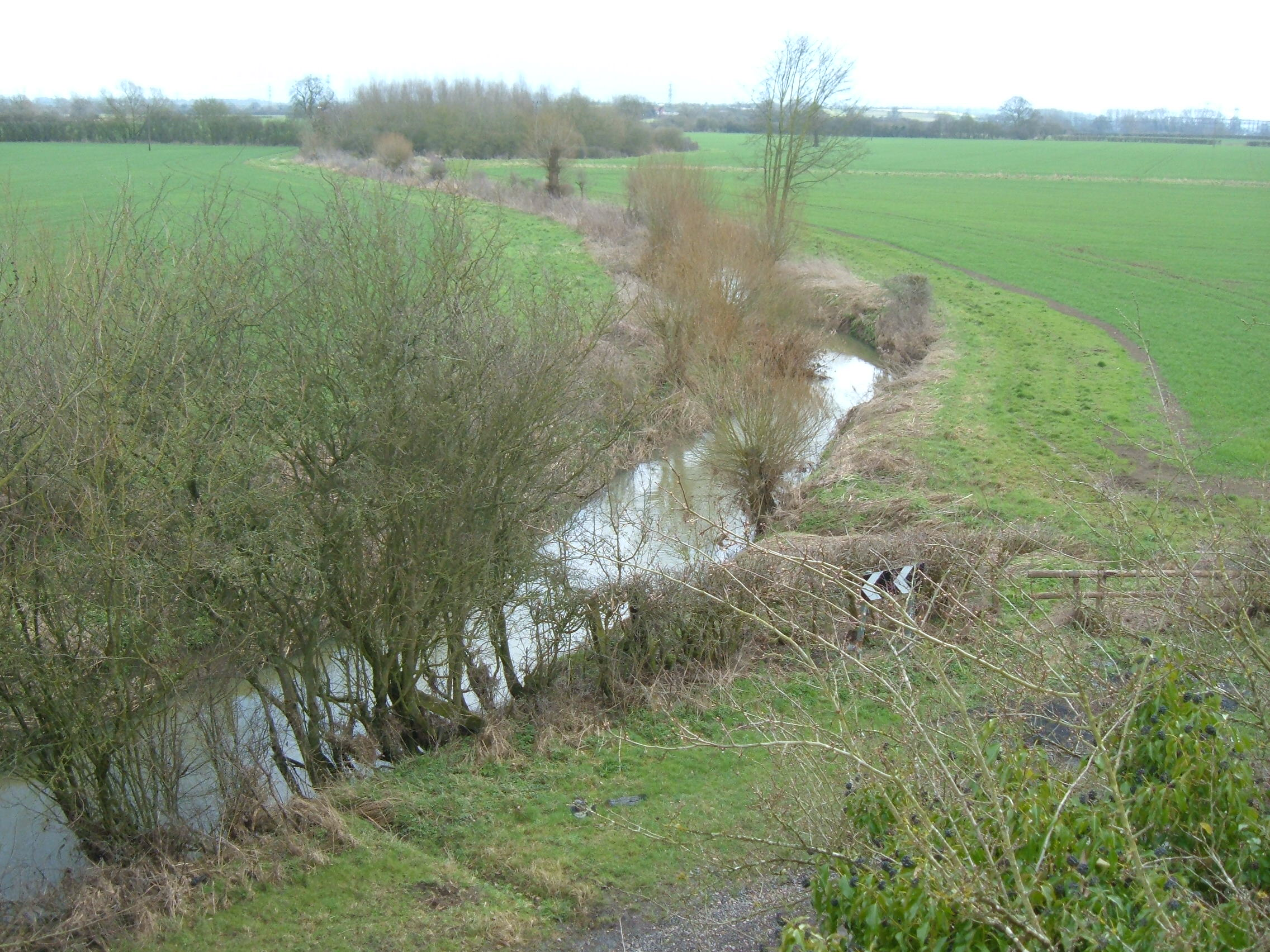
- Claydon Brook, looking towards Granborough

Location
- Country: United Kingdom
- County: Buckinghamshire

Physical characteristics
- Source
  - location: near Drayton Parslow, Borough of Milton Keynes
- Mouth
  - location: Padbury Brook, Padbury, Borough of Milton Keynes
- Length: 24.06 km (14.95 mi)

Claydon Brook is a 24.06 km (14.95 mi) long river in Buckinghamshire, England that is a tributary of Padbury Brook, itself a tributary to the River Great Ouse. Claydon Brook itself has many tributaries, and is commonly used for fishing.

== Course ==
Claydon Brook, a 24.06 km (14.95 mi) long river in Buckinghamshire, begins with two streams near Drayton Parslow, one north of the B4032 rural road, and the other south of the road. Both streams flow west for about 4 km (2.5 mi) before conjoining in Swanbourne; from there, it resumes its westerly course into Winslow and through Granborough, where it receives the waters of Shipton Brook and later Claydon Brook Tributary before proceeding to flow north-west through Addington – where it then receives the waters from Horwood Tributary – and into Padbury, where it finally flows into Padbury Brook. It also flows through Bernwood Forest.

== Human activity ==
The river has several locations which can be used for fishing. Numerous bridges cross Claydon Brook, some dating back to the early modern period.

== Water quality ==
Water quality of Claydon Brook in 2019, according to the Environment Agency, a non-departmental public body sponsored by the UK's Department for Environment, Food and Rural Affairs. The agency splits the river into two separate catchments: the first half is 15.632 km, from its beginning to Winslow, and the second is 8.432 km, recorded from Granborough until the river's end into Padbury Brook.

Sections	Ecological Statuses	Chemical Statuses	Overall Statuses	Lengths	Catchments
Claydon Brook; Claydon Brook (DS Granborough)	Moderate	Fail	Poor	15.632 km (9.713 mi); 8.432 km (5.239 mi)	37.22 km^{2} (14.37 sq mi); 14.66 km^{2} (5.66 sq mi)
