= Tethea subampliata =

Scientific classification
- Domain: Eukaryota
- Kingdom: Animalia
- Phylum: Arthropoda
- Class: Insecta
- Order: Lepidoptera
- Family: Drepanidae
- Genus: Tethea
- Species: T. subampliata

Binomial name
- Tethea subampliata (Houlbert, 1921)

Synonyms
- Cymatophora subampliata Houlbert, 1921; Palimpsestis griseocostata Gaede, 1930; Palimpsestis ro-album Bryk, 1943

Species of false owlet moth

Tethea subampliata is a moth in the family Drepanidae. It is found in the Chinese provinces of Sichuan and Yunnan and in Myanmar.
