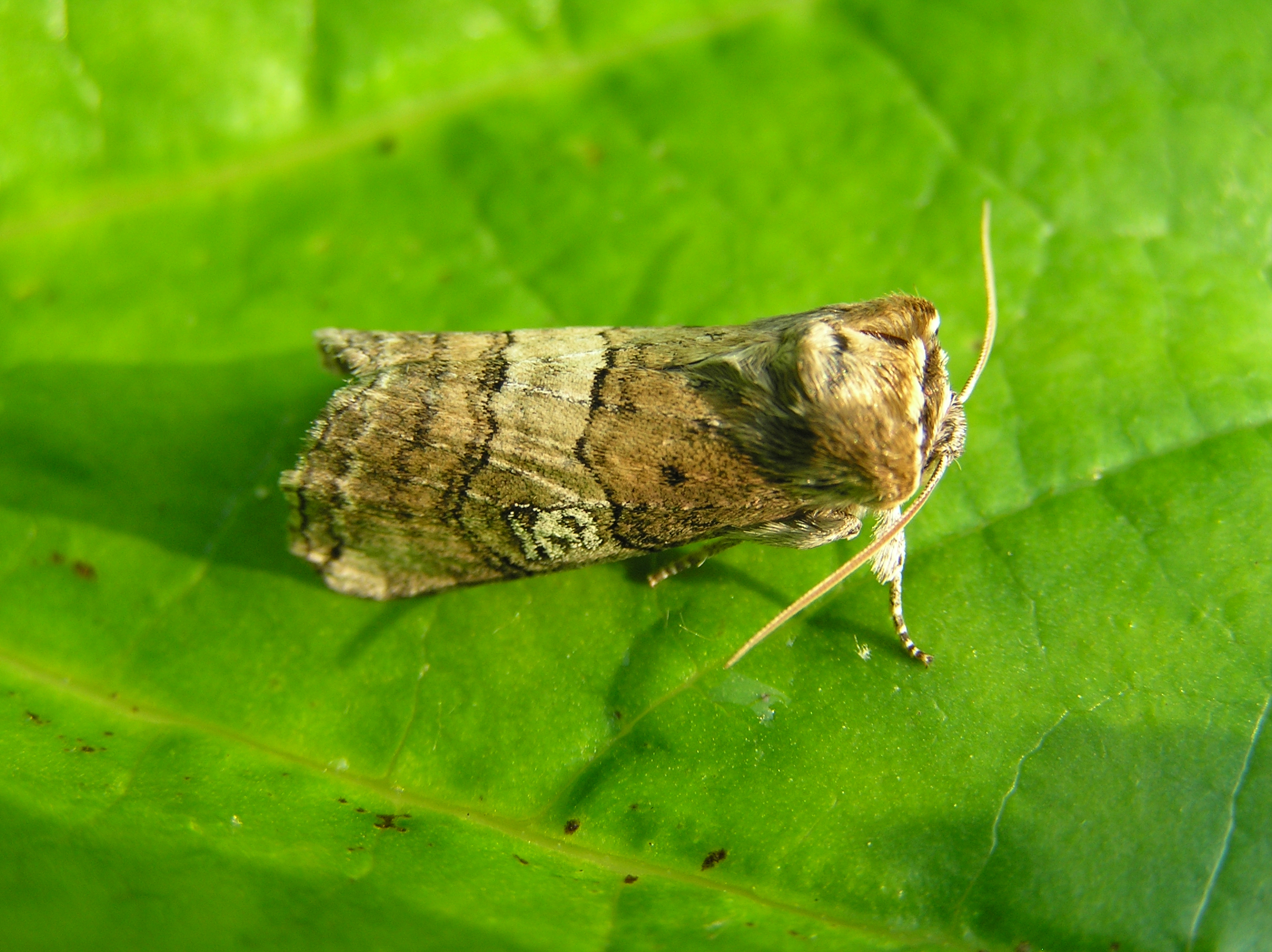

Scientific classification
- Kingdom: Animalia
- Phylum: Arthropoda
- Class: Insecta
- Order: Lepidoptera
- Family: Drepanidae
- Genus: Tethea
- Species: T. ocularis

Binomial name
- Tethea ocularis (Linnaeus, 1767)

Synonyms
- Phalaena ocularis Linnaeus, 1767; Phalaena octogesimea Hübner, 1786; Tethea octogena (Esper, 1788); Cymalophora octogesima var. caucasica Krulikowsky, 1901; Tethea ocularis caucasica Werny, 1966; Tethea ocularis kosswigi Werny, 1966; Tethea ocularis sareptensis Zolotuhin, 1997; Tethea ocularis tsinlingensis Werny, 1966; Cylamophora osthelderi Bytinski-Salz & Brandt, 1937; Tethea caspica Ebert, 1976

= Tethea ocularis =

Species of false owlet moth

Tethea ocularis, the figure of eighty, is a moth of the family Drepanidae. The species was first described by Carl Linnaeus in his 1767 12th edition of Systema Naturae. It is found throughout Continental Europe and has a scattered distribution in England and Wales, although it is absent from Scotland and Ireland.

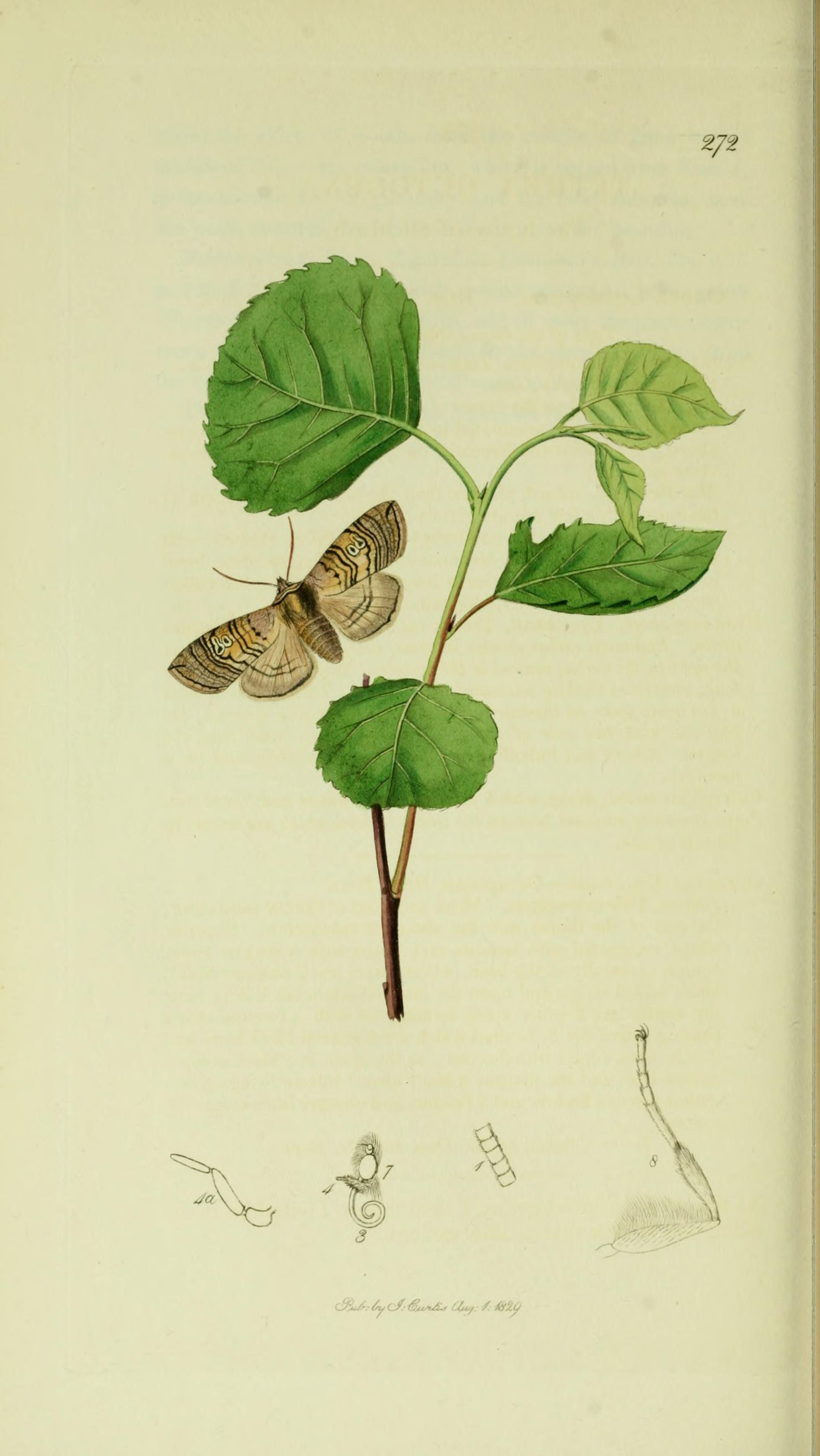
Illustration from John Curtis's British Entomology Volume 5

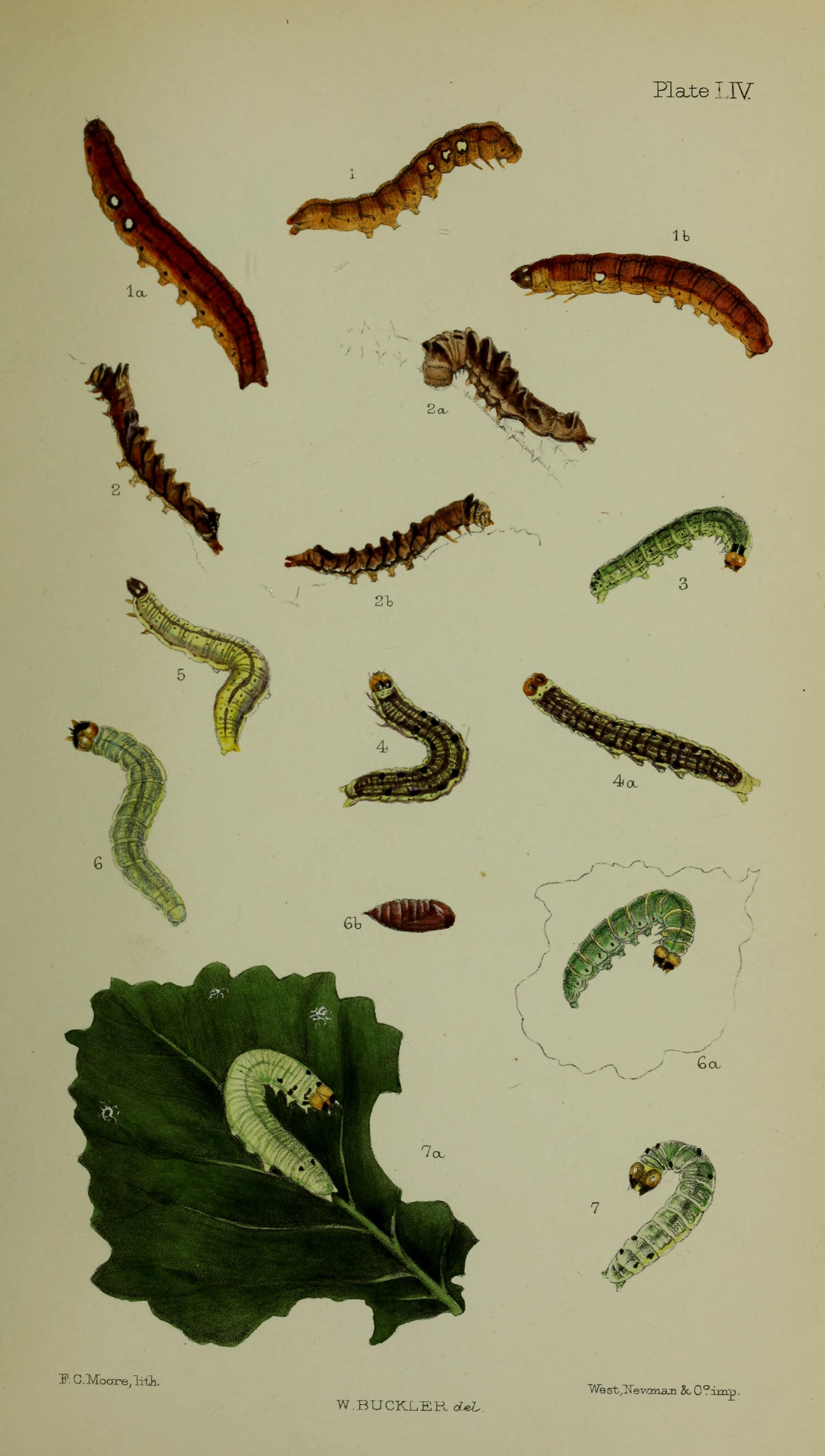
Fig 7, 7a larvae after final moult

The wingspan is 35–45 mm; the dark brown forewings being marked with dark-centred white stigmata which do look rather like the number 80. The hindwings are grey. The species flies from May to July and is attracted to light and sugar.

The grey and white larva feeds on poplar and aspen. The species overwinters as a pupa.

== Subspecies ==
- Tethea ocularis ocularis
- Tethea ocularis ocularis amurensis (Warren, 1912) (Russian Far East, north-eastern and northern China, Mongolia, Korea)
- Tethea ocularis opa Zolotuhin, 1997 (Uzbekistan, China: Xinjiang)
- Tethea ocularis osthelderi (Bytinski-Salz & Brandt, 1937) (Iran)
- Tethea ocularis tanakai Inoue, 1982 (Japan)
1. The flight season refers to the British Isles. This may vary in other parts of the range.
