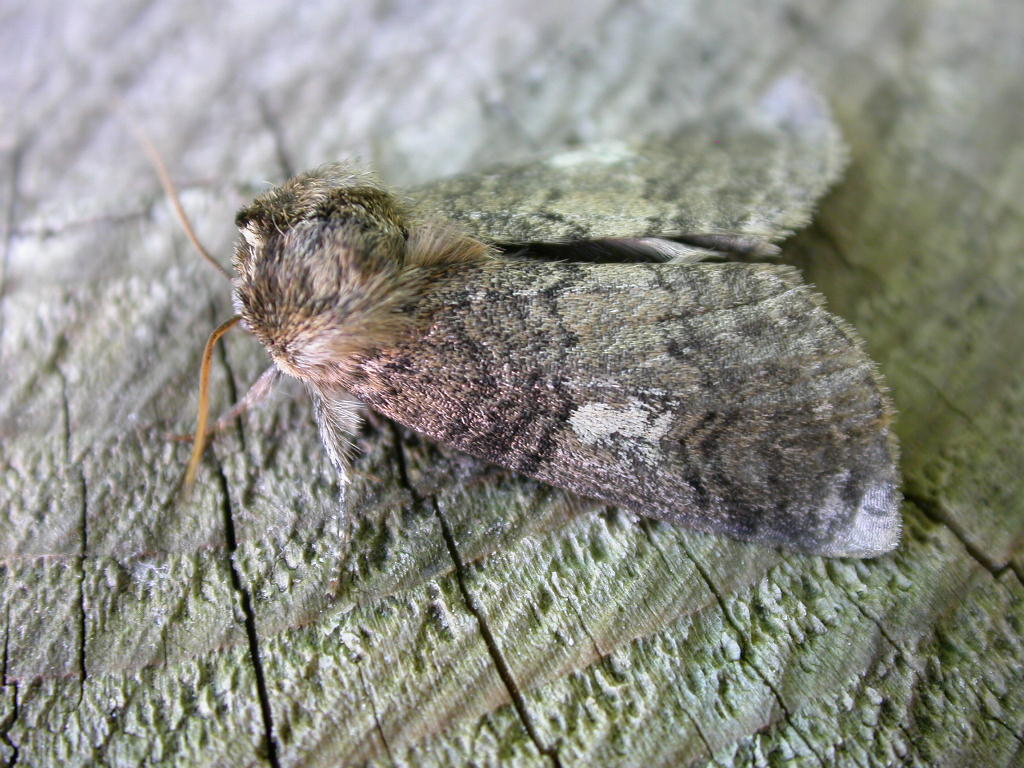

Scientific classification
- Kingdom: Animalia
- Phylum: Arthropoda
- Class: Insecta
- Order: Lepidoptera
- Family: Drepanidae
- Genus: Tethea
- Species: T. or

Binomial name
- Tethea or (Denis & Schiffermüller, 1775)

Synonyms
- Noctua or Denis & Schiffermüller, 1775; Noctua ypsilon-graecum Goeze, 1781; Noctua gamma-graecum Retzius, 1783; Noctua consobrina Borkhausen, 1790; Noctua octogena Esper, 1791; Phalaena (Noctua) gemina Beckwith, 1794; Tethea flavicornis Aurivillius, 1888; Palimpsestis or hela Rangnow, 1935; Tethea or nigrescens Werny, 1966; Palimpsestis rufa Houlbert, 1921; Cymatophora intermedia Houlbert, 1921; Palimpsestis kurilensis Matsumura, 1929; Palimpsestis akanensis koreibia Bryk, 1948

= Tethea or =

Species of false owlet moth

Tethea or, the poplar lutestring, is a moth of the family Drepanidae. It was first described by Michael Denis and Ignaz Schiffermüller in 1775. The species can be found in Europe, northern and eastern Asia and Japan. The imago resembles Tethea ocularis.

The wingspan is 38 – 43 mm. The moths flies from April to August depending on the location.

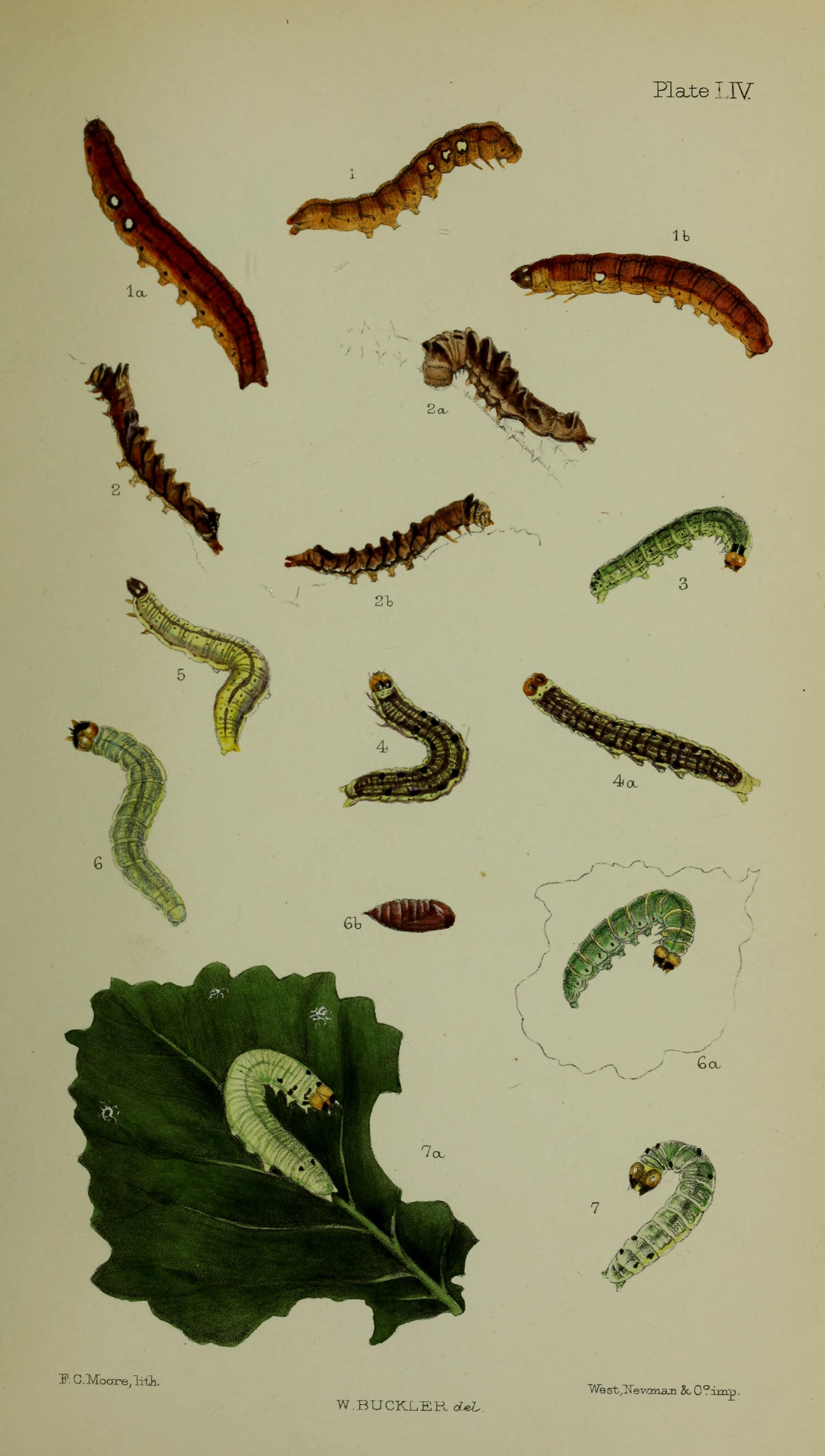
Figs 6, 6a larvae after final moult 6b pupa

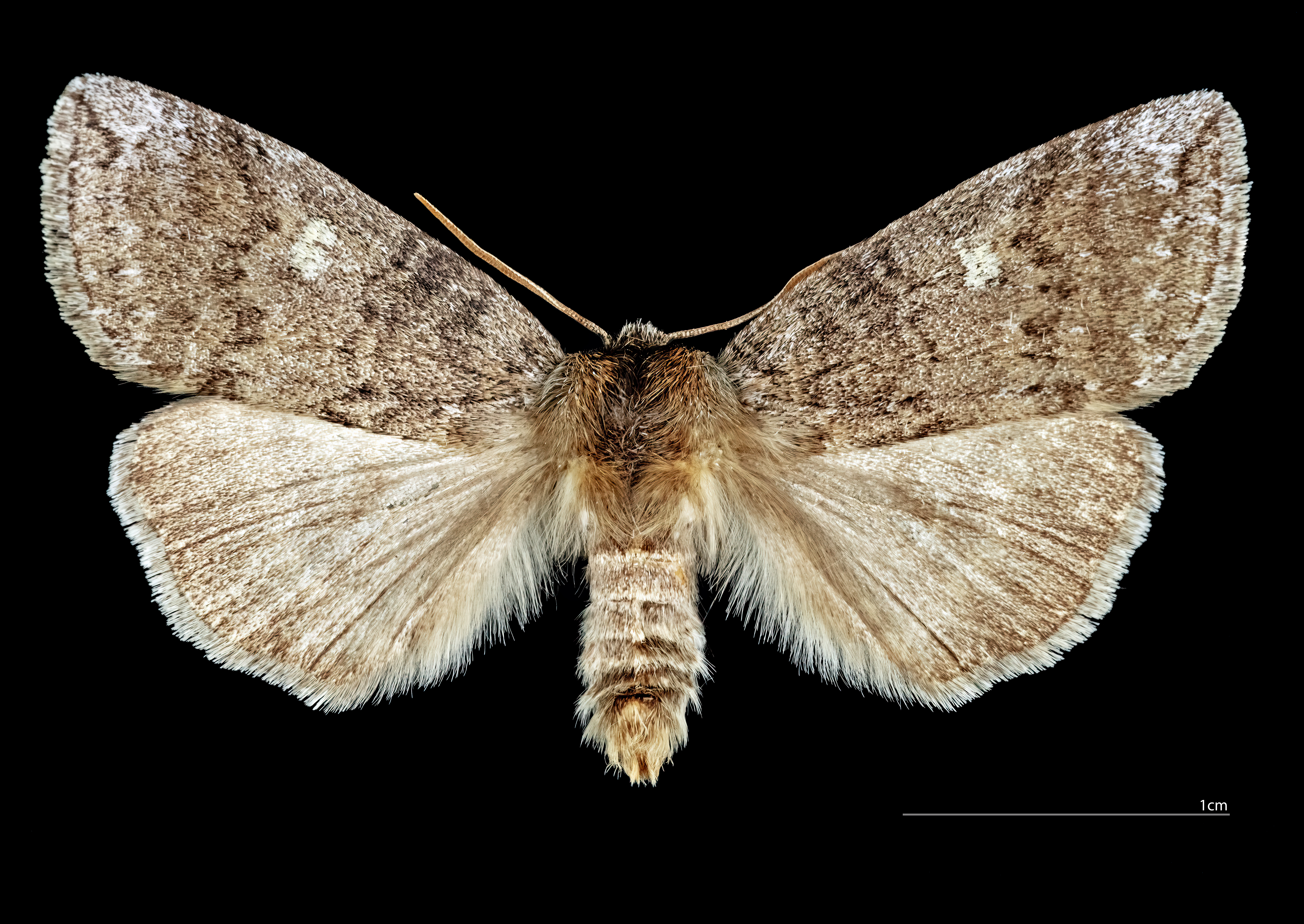
♂

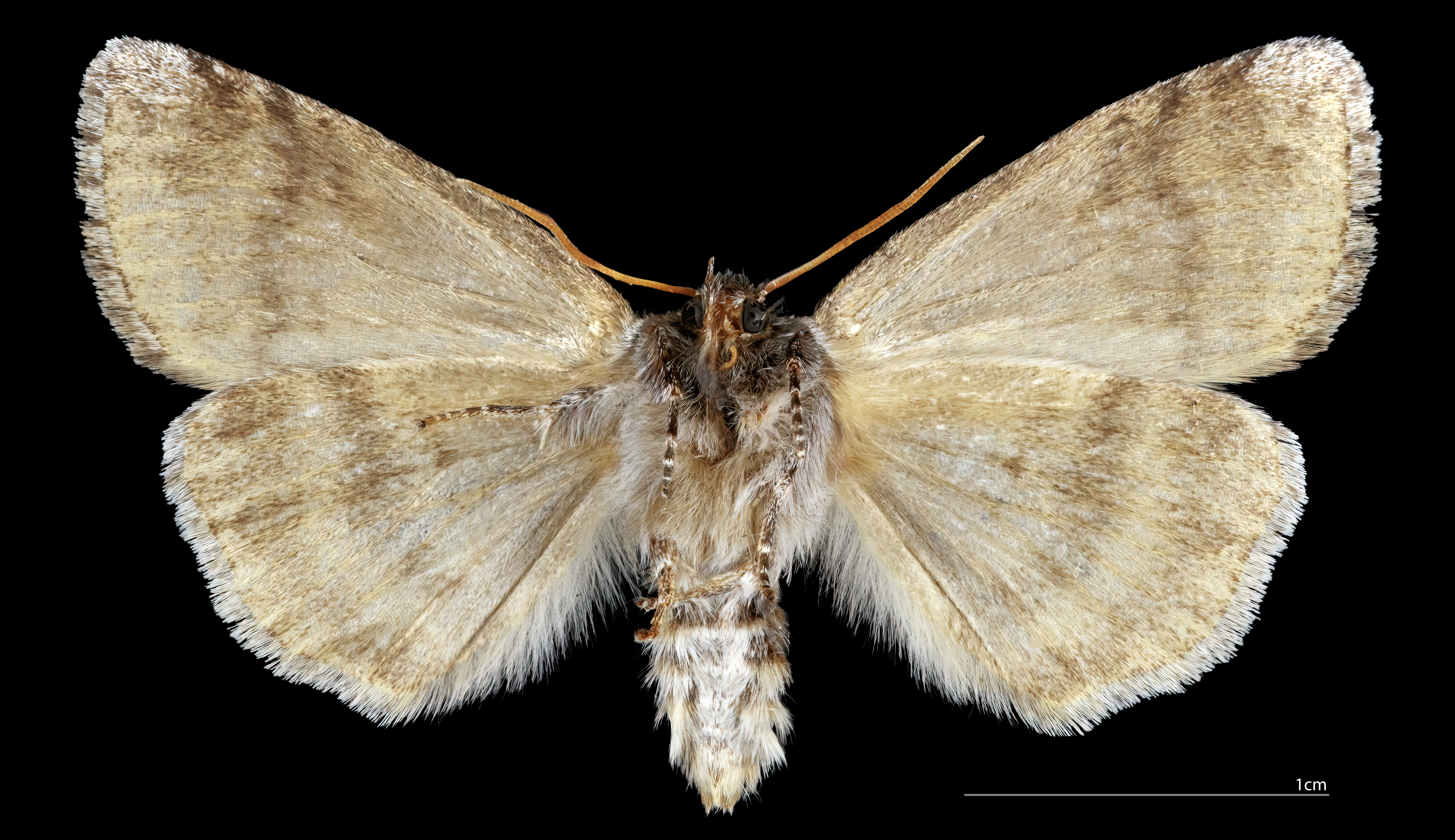
♂ △

The larvae feed on willow and poplar, mainly Populus tremula.

== Subspecies ==
- Tethea or or (Europe to Turkey)
- Tethea or akanensis (Matsumura, 1933) (Japan)
- Tethea or terrosa (Graeser, 1888) (Russia, Korea, Mongolia, China: Heilongjiang, Jilin, Liaoning, Inner Mongolia, Beijing, Shanxi, Shaanxi, Ningxia, Gansu, Xinjiang)
