= Waterperry Wood =

Protected area in Oxfordshire, England

Coordinates: 51.778°N 1.124°W

- Site of Special Scientific Interest
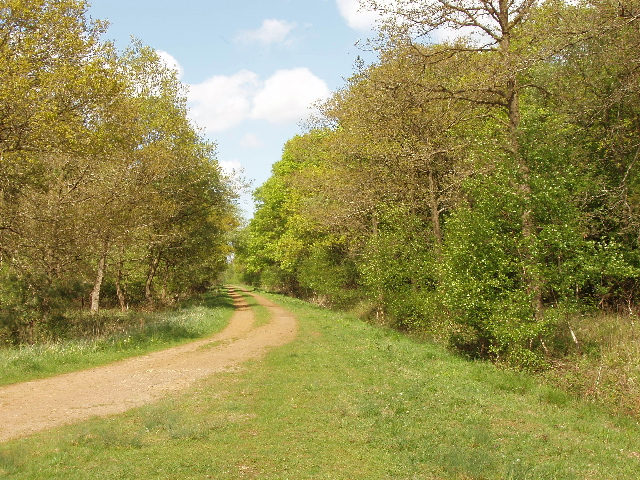
- Location of Waterperry Wood.
- Area of search: Oxfordshire
- Grid reference: SP 605 092
- Interest: Biological
- Area: 137.0 hectares (339 acres)
- Notification date: 1986
- Location map: Magic Map

Waterperry Wood is a 137-hectare (340-acre) biological Site of Special Scientific Interest (SSSI) east of Oxford in Oxfordshire, England. It is a Nature Conservation Review site, Grade I, and is owned and managed by the Forestry Commission.

This wood has been designated an SSSI because it contains a diverse and important insect fauna, with many nationally uncommon and rare species. There are nineteen species of nationally uncommon hoverflies, including five which are listed in the British Red Data Book of Insects, many nationally uncommon beetles, thirty butterfly species and several rare moths.
