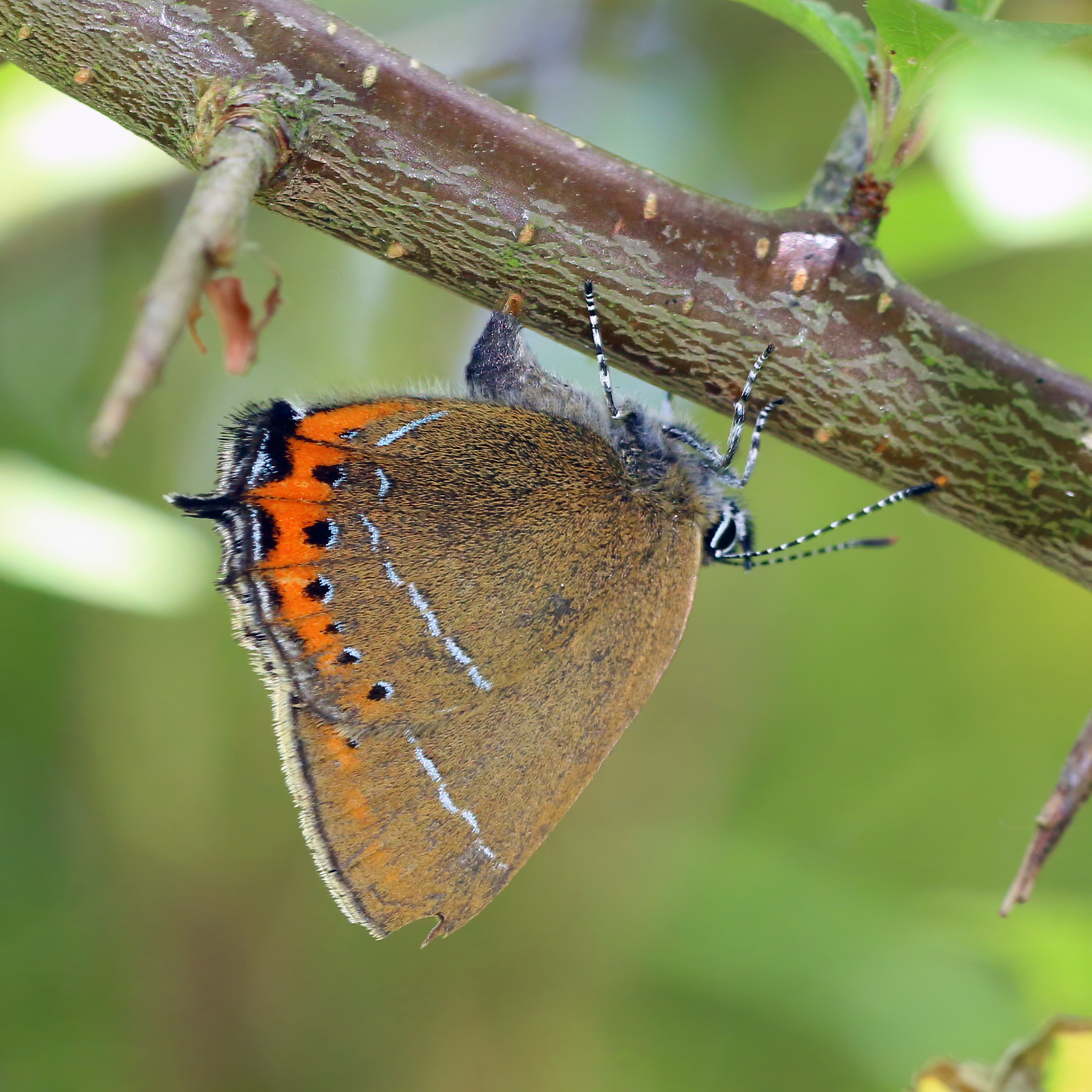
- Female laying egg, Buckinghamshire
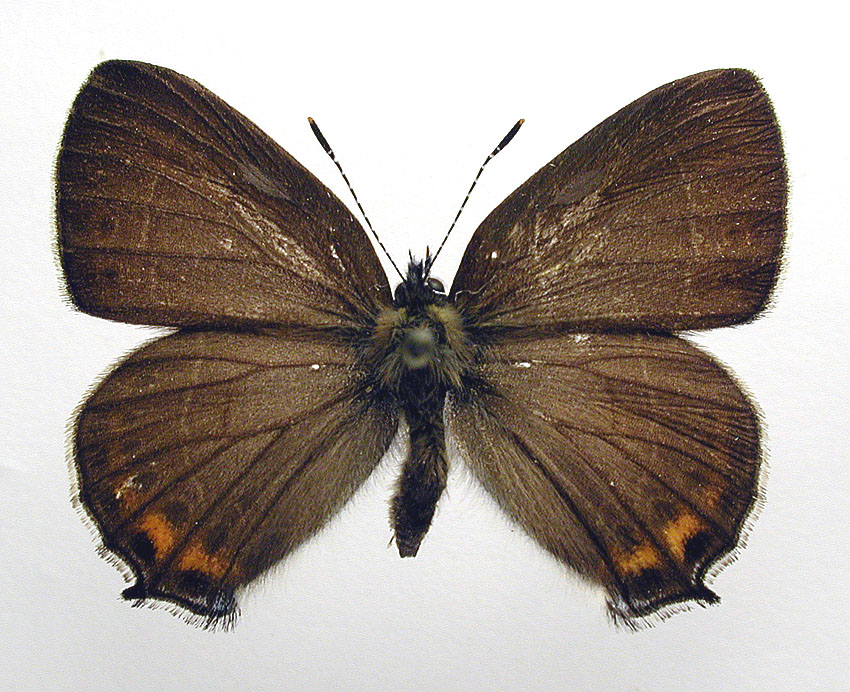
- Museum specimen of unknown age

Scientific classification
- Kingdom: Animalia
- Phylum: Arthropoda
- Clade: Pancrustacea
- Class: Insecta
- Order: Lepidoptera
- Family: Lycaenidae
- Genus: Satyrium
- Species: S. pruni

Binomial name
- Satyrium pruni (Linnaeus, 1758)

Synonyms
- Fixsenia pruni Strymonidia pruni Nordmannia pruni

= Black hairstreak =

Species of butterfly

The black hairstreak (Satyrium pruni) is a butterfly in the family Lycaenidae.

== Distribution ==
The butterfly is native to Europe, from Scandinavia to Ukraine, and is found as far east as Mongolia, Korea and Japan. It is considered by IUCN to be stable and of least concern.

== Description in Seitz ==
T. pruni L. (73 d). Above in the male with a few anal spots, in the female an anal halfband and sometimes a discal spot brick-red. Beneath the line of white bars is very thin, and the brick-red submarginal band of the hindwing is placed between two rows of black spots, which are thinly edged with bluish white, and is sometimes continued on to the forewing. Throughout Central and South Europe, from the Atlantic coast and Great Britain throughout Europe and Asia to Amurland and Corea; but absent from North Africa and probably also from Japan, the specimens recorded from the latter country presumably belonging to mera or prunoides In ab. fulvior Tutt (particularly females) the forewing bears an orange-yellow discal patch, the rest of the wing being dusted with golden brown. In ab. ptorsas Hfngl. both wings have a reddish yellow submarginal band above; transitional specimens have an incomplete band (ab. progressa, excessa). ab. obsoleta Tutt has no reddish yellow anal spots above, while these spots are pale yellow instead of red in ab. lutea Tutt. A lutea specimen in which the underside is dull and has no black spots on the proximal side of the band on the hindwing has received the name ab. paupera Tutt, and individuals with a broad white macular band on the underside parallel to the outer margin are ab. albofasciata Tutt. — Egg quite flat, chagreen, greyish brown, with the top concave; deposited singly or in pairs. Larva woodlouse-shaped, green, with a darker dorsal stripe, at the sides of which there are small brown warts or tubercles; from April till the end of May on Blackthorn and Plumtrees. It has been observed to attack other pruni larvae which had fastened themselves before moulting (Frohawk). Pupa anteriorly somewhat angular, black-brown, with darker markings and a pale saddle-patch, the abdomen being tuberculate and strongly raised, the whole resembling a small bud or bird-droppings. The butterflies appear in June, usually flying singly, being so abundant however in certain years that one can easily obtain several dozen within an hour. At such occasions they fly about the twigs of the food-trees and the undergrowth beneath them; they are very partial to flowering privet.

=== Great Britain ===
It is rare in Great Britain and restricted to a number of sites in the south and east Midlands, between Oxford and Peterborough. The largest breeding colony is in Ham Home-cum-Hamgreen Woods in Buckinghamshire. Historically there have been around 90 known colonies since its discovery in 1828 but there have been many, mostly unsuccessful, introductions at various locations in southern England including one in Surrey in 1952 that seemed to be successful until the habitat was destroyed. It is now one of the rarest butterflies in Great Britain.

In June 2018, it was announced that a large population had been discovered in East Sussex, and it was observed in Oxfordshire at a site where it had not been seen since 1988.

=== Continental Europe ===
It is found in most countries of continental Europe, except Mediterranean coastal regions. While widespread, the species is local and habitat-dependent. It is declining in the east of the region.

=== Scandinavia ===
The black hairstreak is found in the south of Finland and Sweden, and extinct in Denmark.

== Appearance, behaviour (Great Britain) ==
Note that information on this species applies to Great Britain and some details may not be consistent with the species in other parts of its range.

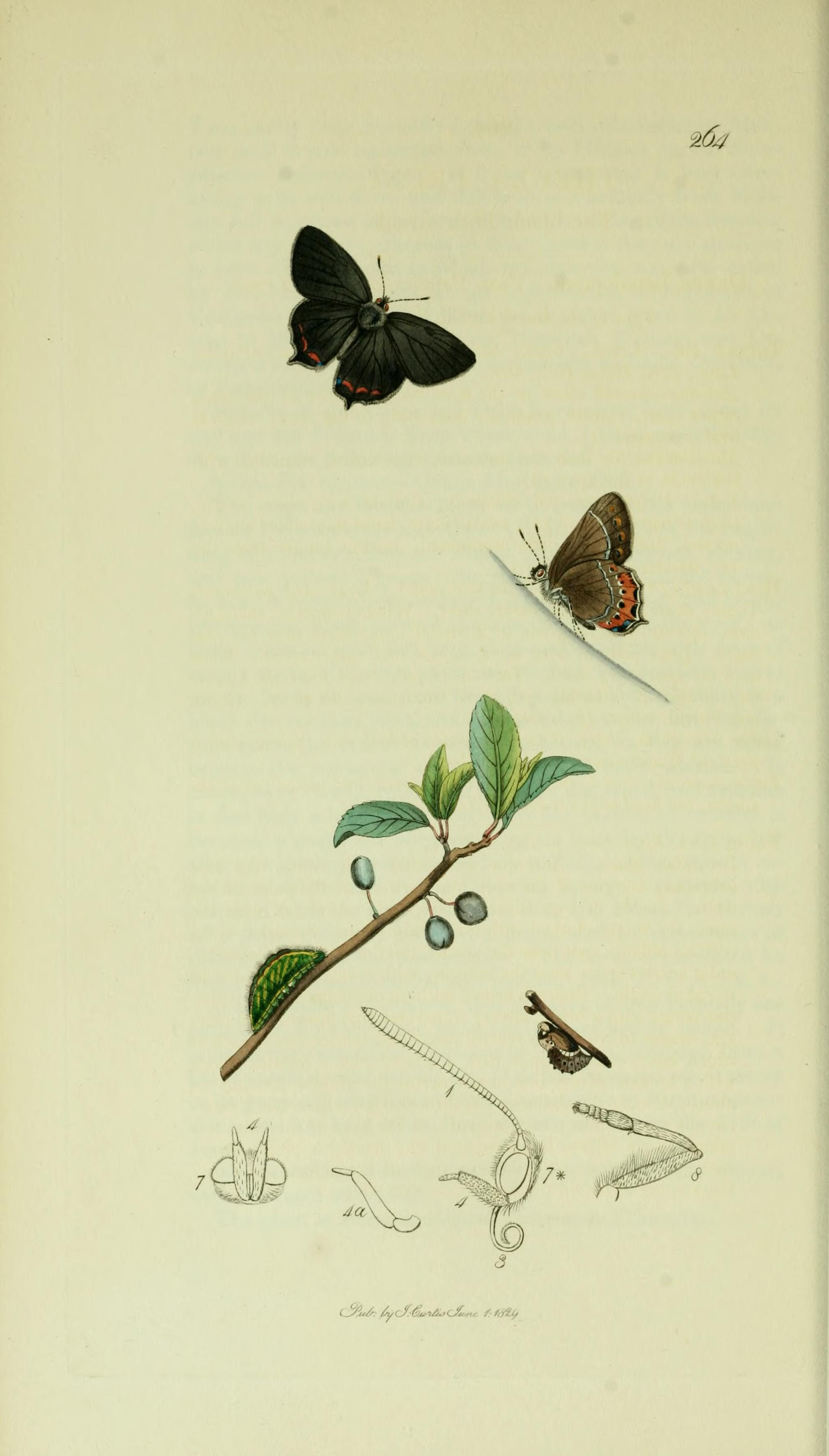
Illustration from John Curtis's British Entomology Volume 5

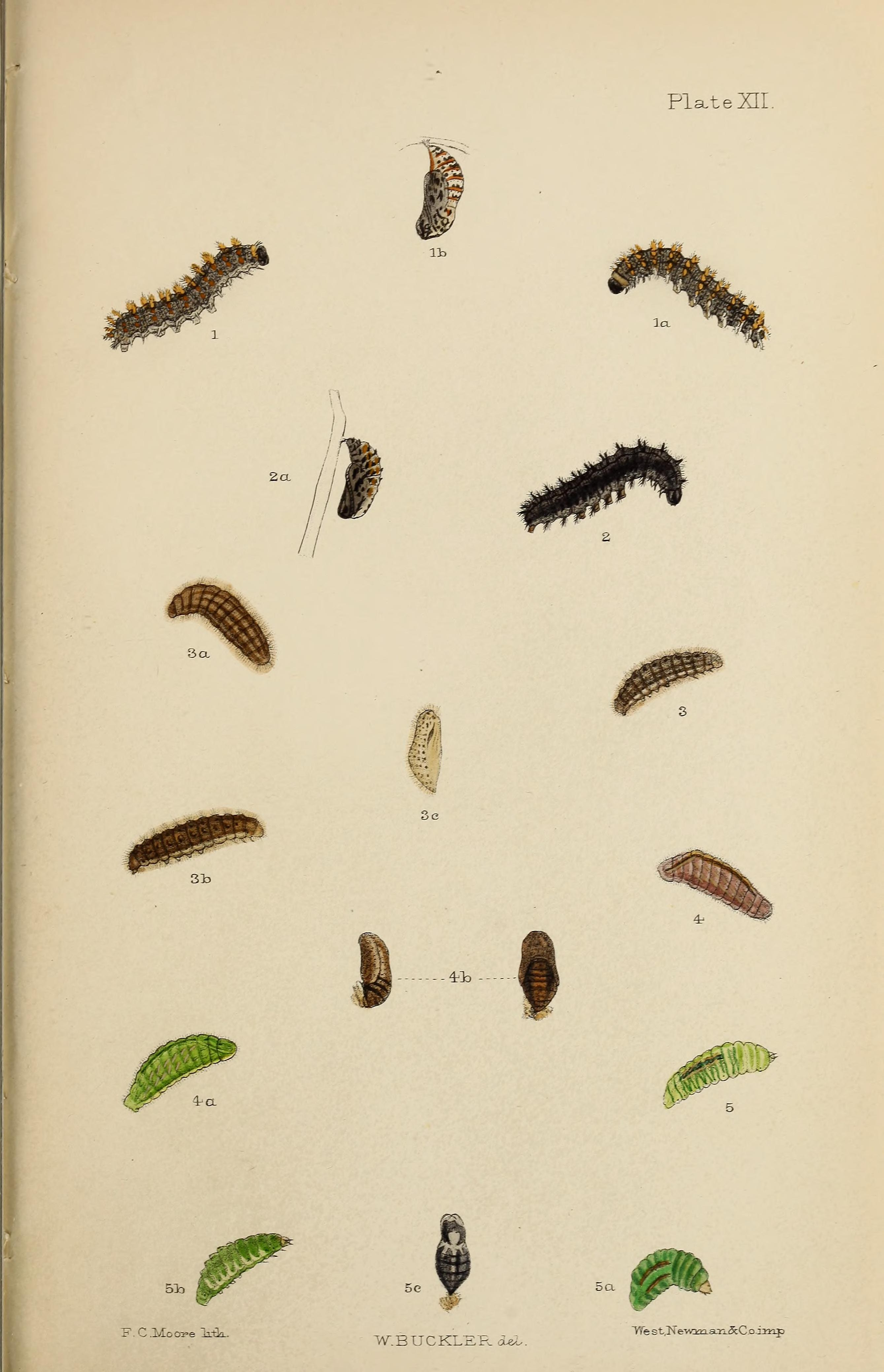
Figs 5, 5a, 5b larva after last moult 5c pupa

This small brown butterfly, wingspan about 37mm, is very similar to the white-letter hairstreak but the black hairstreak has a row of orange spots along the edge of the upper-side hindwing. In the female these spots also extend to the forewings. The undersides are similar to the white-letter but the white line tends to be straighter and the orange border extends onto the forewings. The most conclusive way to distinguish the two is by the row of black spots accompanying the orange band which the white-letter hairstreak never has. They spend most of their lives in the canopy or in dense scrub, feeding on honeydew, and very rarely come down to ground level.

== Life cycle and foodplants ==
Eggs are laid singly on young blackthorn Prunus spinosa growth and it is this stage which hibernates. Although blackthorn is the main foodplant, wild plum Prunus domestica and other Prunus spp are occasionally used. The caterpillar hatches the following spring, at the end of April, just before the buds open and feeds on the flower buds. Older larvae are green and well camouflaged against the leaves on which they feed. They may be seen and monitored more easily with the use of UV light, under which the larvae glow. Pupation takes place on leaves or twigs in June and the pupae are patterned black and white to mimic a bird dropping, as a defence against being eaten. The adult butterflies of this single-brood (univoltine) species are on the wing from the end of June to mid July.

== See also ==
- List of butterflies of Great Britain
- Salcey Forest
- Yardley Chase
