= Thornborough, Buckinghamshire =

Village and civil parish in Buckinghamshire, England

Coordinates: 51.9969°N 0.9181°W

Thornborough
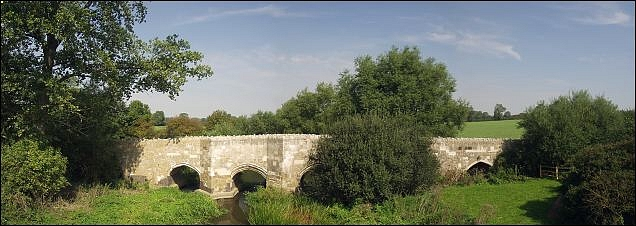
- The mediæval bridge near Thornborough, in use from c.1400 until 1974.

- Location within Buckinghamshire
- Population: 641 (2011)
- OS grid reference: SP742334
- Civil parish: Thornborough
- Unitary authority: Buckinghamshire
- Ceremonial county: Buckinghamshire
- Region: South East
- Country: England
- Sovereign state: United Kingdom
- Post town: BUCKINGHAM
- Postcode district: MK18
- Dialling code: 01280
- Police: Thames Valley
- Fire: Buckinghamshire
- Ambulance: South Central
- UK Parliament: Buckingham and Bletchley

Thornborough is a village and civil parish in north Buckinghamshire, England, around 2 miles (3.2 km) east of Buckingham.

== History ==
The village name is Anglo-Saxon in origin, and means "hill where thorn trees grow". It was recorded as Torneberge in the Domesday Book of 1086, as Tornburuwe in the 13th century, and as Thornborowe in the 16th century.

Thornborough Inclosure Act 1797
- Act of Parliament
- Parliament of Great Britain
- Long title: An act for dividing and enclosing the open and common fields, common meadows, common pastures, and other commonable lands and grounds, within the parish of Thornborough, in the county of Buckingham.
- Citation: 37 Geo. 3. c. 49 Pr.
- Territorial extent: Great Britain

Dates
- Royal assent: 24 April 1797
- Commencement: 24 April 1797 (Note: The Acts of Parliament (Commencement) Act 1793.)

Status: Current legislation

An inclosure act for Thornborough, the Thornborough Inclosure Act 1797 (37 Geo. 3. c. 49 Pr.), was passed in 1797.

The village has the earthworks of a Roman village on its western border, in between Thornborough Bridge and the main village. Near the bridge on the north side of the road are the Thornborough Mounds, two tumuli in which Roman remains were found in 1839. They are a scheduled monument.

== Buildings ==
There is a manor house with associated tithe barns in the centre of the village next to the pond.

The village church, St Mary, is one of very few in Britain to have steel bells. The church has been repaired, restored and extended many times with some parts dating back to the 12th century. The tower was built early in the 15th century and the south porch about 1480.

The village pub, The Two Brewers, is a thatched building with two bars. It has been run by the same family since 1982. A second pub, The Lone Tree, on the outskirts of the village on the A421, was severely damaged by fire in November 2007. In serious need of repair, it was finally sold as a private dwelling in 2014.

To the north of the village is the remains of an old windmill and on the River Great Ouse are the buildings of what used to be a working watermill. The disused Buckingham Arm of the Grand Union Canal runs between Buckingham and Western Milton Keynes to the north of Thornborough.

== Thornborough Bridge ==
Located on the western boundary of the parish with Buckingham, Thornborough Bridge dates from the 14th century and is the only surviving mediaeval bridge in the county. The parish boundary follows the line of Padbury Brook (which joins the river Great Ouse at 'The Twins'). The new bridge taking the A421 was built in 1974.
